

285001–285100 

|-bgcolor=#E9E9E9
| 285001 ||  || — || September 28, 2006 || Kitt Peak || Spacewatch || — || align=right | 1.0 km || 
|-id=002 bgcolor=#fefefe
| 285002 ||  || — || March 5, 2006 || Anderson Mesa || LONEOS || H || align=right data-sort-value="0.68" | 680 m || 
|-id=003 bgcolor=#E9E9E9
| 285003 ||  || — || October 14, 2001 || Socorro || LINEAR || PAD || align=right | 1.9 km || 
|-id=004 bgcolor=#fefefe
| 285004 ||  || — || September 29, 2003 || Apache Point || SDSS || — || align=right data-sort-value="0.85" | 850 m || 
|-id=005 bgcolor=#E9E9E9
| 285005 ||  || — || December 15, 2001 || Socorro || LINEAR || — || align=right | 3.7 km || 
|-id=006 bgcolor=#fefefe
| 285006 ||  || — || October 15, 1995 || Kitt Peak || Spacewatch || — || align=right data-sort-value="0.91" | 910 m || 
|-id=007 bgcolor=#fefefe
| 285007 ||  || — || September 30, 2006 || Mount Lemmon || Mount Lemmon Survey || MAS || align=right data-sort-value="0.86" | 860 m || 
|-id=008 bgcolor=#d6d6d6
| 285008 ||  || — || September 30, 2005 || Mount Lemmon || Mount Lemmon Survey || EOS || align=right | 2.7 km || 
|-id=009 bgcolor=#d6d6d6
| 285009 ||  || — || December 9, 2004 || Catalina || CSS || — || align=right | 3.3 km || 
|-id=010 bgcolor=#fefefe
| 285010 ||  || — || July 9, 2005 || Kitt Peak || Spacewatch || — || align=right data-sort-value="0.76" | 760 m || 
|-id=011 bgcolor=#fefefe
| 285011 ||  || — || April 5, 2000 || Socorro || LINEAR || NYS || align=right data-sort-value="0.80" | 800 m || 
|-id=012 bgcolor=#E9E9E9
| 285012 ||  || — || February 7, 2002 || Palomar || NEAT || — || align=right | 2.3 km || 
|-id=013 bgcolor=#d6d6d6
| 285013 ||  || — || July 2, 2008 || Kitt Peak || Spacewatch || — || align=right | 4.1 km || 
|-id=014 bgcolor=#d6d6d6
| 285014 ||  || — || January 28, 2006 || Mount Lemmon || Mount Lemmon Survey || — || align=right | 3.6 km || 
|-id=015 bgcolor=#d6d6d6
| 285015 ||  || — || March 25, 1995 || Kitt Peak || Spacewatch || — || align=right | 3.5 km || 
|-id=016 bgcolor=#E9E9E9
| 285016 ||  || — || September 3, 2004 || Palomar || NEAT || GAL || align=right | 4.3 km || 
|-id=017 bgcolor=#E9E9E9
| 285017 ||  || — || December 25, 2005 || Kitt Peak || Spacewatch || — || align=right | 2.2 km || 
|-id=018 bgcolor=#d6d6d6
| 285018 ||  || — || September 19, 2001 || Socorro || LINEAR || SYL7:4 || align=right | 4.0 km || 
|-id=019 bgcolor=#E9E9E9
| 285019 ||  || — || February 26, 2007 || Mount Lemmon || Mount Lemmon Survey || — || align=right | 1.0 km || 
|-id=020 bgcolor=#d6d6d6
| 285020 ||  || — || April 3, 2000 || Socorro || LINEAR || EUP || align=right | 5.7 km || 
|-id=021 bgcolor=#d6d6d6
| 285021 ||  || — || January 7, 2005 || Catalina || CSS || — || align=right | 4.0 km || 
|-id=022 bgcolor=#E9E9E9
| 285022 ||  || — || March 15, 2007 || Kitt Peak || Spacewatch || — || align=right | 1.1 km || 
|-id=023 bgcolor=#d6d6d6
| 285023 ||  || — || January 28, 2006 || Kitt Peak || Spacewatch || — || align=right | 2.7 km || 
|-id=024 bgcolor=#d6d6d6
| 285024 ||  || — || September 19, 2003 || Palomar || NEAT || — || align=right | 4.8 km || 
|-id=025 bgcolor=#d6d6d6
| 285025 ||  || — || September 26, 2003 || Apache Point || SDSS || — || align=right | 2.5 km || 
|-id=026 bgcolor=#d6d6d6
| 285026 ||  || — || September 17, 2003 || Palomar || NEAT || — || align=right | 3.6 km || 
|-id=027 bgcolor=#d6d6d6
| 285027 ||  || — || October 5, 2002 || Apache Point || SDSS || THM || align=right | 2.8 km || 
|-id=028 bgcolor=#d6d6d6
| 285028 || 2011 EO || — || December 10, 2004 || Kitt Peak || Spacewatch || HYG || align=right | 2.9 km || 
|-id=029 bgcolor=#E9E9E9
| 285029 ||  || — || March 27, 2003 || Kitt Peak || Spacewatch || — || align=right data-sort-value="0.80" | 800 m || 
|-id=030 bgcolor=#d6d6d6
| 285030 ||  || — || September 28, 2002 || Haleakala || NEAT || — || align=right | 4.9 km || 
|-id=031 bgcolor=#d6d6d6
| 285031 ||  || — || September 20, 2008 || Mount Lemmon || Mount Lemmon Survey || THM || align=right | 3.3 km || 
|-id=032 bgcolor=#E9E9E9
| 285032 ||  || — || November 4, 2005 || Kitt Peak || Spacewatch || AGNslow || align=right | 1.9 km || 
|-id=033 bgcolor=#d6d6d6
| 285033 ||  || — || November 18, 1998 || Kitt Peak || Spacewatch || — || align=right | 3.1 km || 
|-id=034 bgcolor=#fefefe
| 285034 ||  || — || October 25, 2005 || Mount Lemmon || Mount Lemmon Survey || MAS || align=right data-sort-value="0.95" | 950 m || 
|-id=035 bgcolor=#d6d6d6
| 285035 ||  || — || February 3, 2000 || Socorro || LINEAR || EOS || align=right | 2.4 km || 
|-id=036 bgcolor=#fefefe
| 285036 ||  || — || April 6, 2000 || Anderson Mesa || LONEOS || NYS || align=right data-sort-value="0.70" | 700 m || 
|-id=037 bgcolor=#fefefe
| 285037 ||  || — || December 29, 2003 || Kitt Peak || Spacewatch || — || align=right data-sort-value="0.65" | 650 m || 
|-id=038 bgcolor=#d6d6d6
| 285038 ||  || — || March 26, 2006 || Kitt Peak || Spacewatch || — || align=right | 2.9 km || 
|-id=039 bgcolor=#d6d6d6
| 285039 ||  || — || August 30, 2002 || Kitt Peak || Spacewatch || — || align=right | 3.1 km || 
|-id=040 bgcolor=#d6d6d6
| 285040 ||  || — || February 20, 2006 || Kitt Peak || Spacewatch || KOR || align=right | 1.7 km || 
|-id=041 bgcolor=#d6d6d6
| 285041 ||  || — || July 25, 2007 || Lulin Observatory || LUSS || — || align=right | 4.7 km || 
|-id=042 bgcolor=#d6d6d6
| 285042 ||  || — || March 4, 2006 || Mount Lemmon || Mount Lemmon Survey || — || align=right | 2.7 km || 
|-id=043 bgcolor=#fefefe
| 285043 ||  || — || September 11, 2005 || Kitt Peak || Spacewatch || — || align=right data-sort-value="0.82" | 820 m || 
|-id=044 bgcolor=#E9E9E9
| 285044 ||  || — || March 12, 2007 || Kitt Peak || Spacewatch || — || align=right | 1.1 km || 
|-id=045 bgcolor=#E9E9E9
| 285045 ||  || — || December 3, 2005 || Kitt Peak || Spacewatch || — || align=right | 1.2 km || 
|-id=046 bgcolor=#d6d6d6
| 285046 ||  || — || March 30, 2000 || Kitt Peak || Spacewatch || THM || align=right | 2.2 km || 
|-id=047 bgcolor=#E9E9E9
| 285047 ||  || — || December 25, 2005 || Anderson Mesa || LONEOS || POS || align=right | 3.8 km || 
|-id=048 bgcolor=#E9E9E9
| 285048 ||  || — || March 15, 2007 || Kitt Peak || Spacewatch || MAR || align=right | 1.5 km || 
|-id=049 bgcolor=#fefefe
| 285049 ||  || — || November 4, 2005 || Kitt Peak || Spacewatch || NYS || align=right data-sort-value="0.56" | 560 m || 
|-id=050 bgcolor=#fefefe
| 285050 ||  || — || February 25, 2007 || Kitt Peak || Spacewatch || — || align=right data-sort-value="0.86" | 860 m || 
|-id=051 bgcolor=#E9E9E9
| 285051 ||  || — || December 14, 2001 || Socorro || LINEAR || — || align=right | 1.2 km || 
|-id=052 bgcolor=#E9E9E9
| 285052 ||  || — || July 15, 1998 || Kitt Peak || Spacewatch || — || align=right | 3.3 km || 
|-id=053 bgcolor=#d6d6d6
| 285053 ||  || — || May 15, 1996 || Kitt Peak || Spacewatch || — || align=right | 3.7 km || 
|-id=054 bgcolor=#E9E9E9
| 285054 ||  || — || April 8, 2002 || Palomar || NEAT || GAL || align=right | 1.9 km || 
|-id=055 bgcolor=#E9E9E9
| 285055 ||  || — || December 6, 2005 || Kitt Peak || Spacewatch || — || align=right | 3.3 km || 
|-id=056 bgcolor=#fefefe
| 285056 ||  || — || November 6, 2005 || Kitt Peak || Spacewatch || — || align=right data-sort-value="0.86" | 860 m || 
|-id=057 bgcolor=#E9E9E9
| 285057 ||  || — || January 23, 2006 || Mount Lemmon || Mount Lemmon Survey || — || align=right | 1.8 km || 
|-id=058 bgcolor=#E9E9E9
| 285058 ||  || — || April 3, 2002 || Kitt Peak || Spacewatch || — || align=right | 4.7 km || 
|-id=059 bgcolor=#d6d6d6
| 285059 ||  || — || April 29, 2011 || Mount Lemmon || Mount Lemmon Survey || — || align=right | 3.9 km || 
|-id=060 bgcolor=#E9E9E9
| 285060 ||  || — || November 20, 2004 || Kitt Peak || Spacewatch || WIT || align=right | 1.4 km || 
|-id=061 bgcolor=#E9E9E9
| 285061 ||  || — || October 18, 2004 || Kitt Peak || M. W. Buie || KON || align=right | 2.9 km || 
|-id=062 bgcolor=#fefefe
| 285062 ||  || — || February 27, 2007 || Kitt Peak || Spacewatch || V || align=right data-sort-value="0.85" | 850 m || 
|-id=063 bgcolor=#d6d6d6
| 285063 || 2011 KV || — || March 28, 1995 || Kitt Peak || Spacewatch || — || align=right | 3.2 km || 
|-id=064 bgcolor=#E9E9E9
| 285064 ||  || — || October 20, 2003 || Kitt Peak || Spacewatch || — || align=right | 2.8 km || 
|-id=065 bgcolor=#fefefe
| 285065 ||  || — || April 12, 2004 || Palomar || NEAT || — || align=right data-sort-value="0.80" | 800 m || 
|-id=066 bgcolor=#fefefe
| 285066 ||  || — || August 21, 2004 || Catalina || CSS || NYS || align=right data-sort-value="0.88" | 880 m || 
|-id=067 bgcolor=#d6d6d6
| 285067 ||  || — || November 18, 2008 || Kitt Peak || Spacewatch || — || align=right | 3.2 km || 
|-id=068 bgcolor=#d6d6d6
| 285068 ||  || — || April 13, 1996 || Kitt Peak || Spacewatch || KAR || align=right | 1.3 km || 
|-id=069 bgcolor=#E9E9E9
| 285069 ||  || — || October 3, 2008 || Kitt Peak || Spacewatch || — || align=right | 1.0 km || 
|-id=070 bgcolor=#E9E9E9
| 285070 ||  || — || January 16, 2005 || Kitt Peak || Spacewatch || AGN || align=right | 1.3 km || 
|-id=071 bgcolor=#d6d6d6
| 285071 ||  || — || October 27, 2008 || Mount Lemmon || Mount Lemmon Survey || — || align=right | 3.7 km || 
|-id=072 bgcolor=#d6d6d6
| 285072 ||  || — || March 25, 2000 || Kitt Peak || Spacewatch || — || align=right | 2.8 km || 
|-id=073 bgcolor=#fefefe
| 285073 ||  || — || August 30, 2005 || Kitt Peak || Spacewatch || FLO || align=right data-sort-value="0.64" | 640 m || 
|-id=074 bgcolor=#E9E9E9
| 285074 ||  || — || March 24, 2006 || Kitt Peak || Spacewatch || — || align=right | 2.8 km || 
|-id=075 bgcolor=#fefefe
| 285075 ||  || — || March 14, 2004 || Kitt Peak || Spacewatch || — || align=right data-sort-value="0.89" | 890 m || 
|-id=076 bgcolor=#d6d6d6
| 285076 ||  || — || August 16, 2001 || Palomar || NEAT || URS || align=right | 5.0 km || 
|-id=077 bgcolor=#fefefe
| 285077 || 2227 T-2 || — || September 29, 1973 || Palomar || PLS || — || align=right | 1.0 km || 
|-id=078 bgcolor=#fefefe
| 285078 || 2459 T-3 || — || October 16, 1977 || Palomar || PLS || NYS || align=right data-sort-value="0.77" | 770 m || 
|-id=079 bgcolor=#E9E9E9
| 285079 ||  || — || March 7, 1981 || Siding Spring || S. J. Bus || — || align=right | 3.1 km || 
|-id=080 bgcolor=#fefefe
| 285080 ||  || — || March 2, 1981 || Siding Spring || S. J. Bus || — || align=right | 1.3 km || 
|-id=081 bgcolor=#fefefe
| 285081 ||  || — || March 18, 1991 || Kitt Peak || Spacewatch || — || align=right data-sort-value="0.91" | 910 m || 
|-id=082 bgcolor=#E9E9E9
| 285082 ||  || — || October 6, 1991 || Palomar || A. Lowe || BAR || align=right | 1.6 km || 
|-id=083 bgcolor=#E9E9E9
| 285083 ||  || — || February 29, 1992 || La Silla || UESAC || — || align=right | 1.4 km || 
|-id=084 bgcolor=#d6d6d6
| 285084 ||  || — || September 28, 1992 || Kitt Peak || Spacewatch || SAN || align=right | 1.7 km || 
|-id=085 bgcolor=#FA8072
| 285085 ||  || — || October 18, 1992 || Kitt Peak || Spacewatch || — || align=right data-sort-value="0.83" | 830 m || 
|-id=086 bgcolor=#E9E9E9
| 285086 ||  || — || March 19, 1993 || La Silla || UESAC || ADE || align=right | 3.4 km || 
|-id=087 bgcolor=#fefefe
| 285087 ||  || — || April 21, 1993 || Kitt Peak || Spacewatch || — || align=right | 1.2 km || 
|-id=088 bgcolor=#E9E9E9
| 285088 ||  || — || October 9, 1993 || Kitt Peak || Spacewatch || NEM || align=right | 2.8 km || 
|-id=089 bgcolor=#fefefe
| 285089 ||  || — || October 9, 1993 || La Silla || E. W. Elst || — || align=right | 1.2 km || 
|-id=090 bgcolor=#fefefe
| 285090 ||  || — || October 9, 1993 || La Silla || E. W. Elst || — || align=right data-sort-value="0.82" | 820 m || 
|-id=091 bgcolor=#fefefe
| 285091 ||  || — || January 7, 1994 || Kitt Peak || Spacewatch || — || align=right | 1.3 km || 
|-id=092 bgcolor=#E9E9E9
| 285092 ||  || — || January 13, 1994 || Kitt Peak || Spacewatch || — || align=right | 1.8 km || 
|-id=093 bgcolor=#FA8072
| 285093 || 1994 HC || — || April 19, 1994 || Kitt Peak || Spacewatch || — || align=right data-sort-value="0.81" | 810 m || 
|-id=094 bgcolor=#E9E9E9
| 285094 ||  || — || August 10, 1994 || La Silla || E. W. Elst || — || align=right | 1.5 km || 
|-id=095 bgcolor=#fefefe
| 285095 ||  || — || September 2, 1994 || Kitt Peak || Spacewatch || — || align=right data-sort-value="0.86" | 860 m || 
|-id=096 bgcolor=#E9E9E9
| 285096 ||  || — || October 9, 1994 || Kitt Peak || Spacewatch || — || align=right | 1.4 km || 
|-id=097 bgcolor=#d6d6d6
| 285097 ||  || — || October 28, 1994 || Kitt Peak || Spacewatch || — || align=right | 3.3 km || 
|-id=098 bgcolor=#E9E9E9
| 285098 ||  || — || October 28, 1994 || Kitt Peak || Spacewatch || GEF || align=right | 1.5 km || 
|-id=099 bgcolor=#d6d6d6
| 285099 ||  || — || November 1, 1994 || Kitt Peak || Spacewatch || — || align=right | 3.2 km || 
|-id=100 bgcolor=#fefefe
| 285100 ||  || — || November 28, 1994 || Kitt Peak || Spacewatch || ERI || align=right | 1.7 km || 
|}

285101–285200 

|-bgcolor=#d6d6d6
| 285101 ||  || — || November 28, 1994 || Kitt Peak || Spacewatch || VER || align=right | 4.0 km || 
|-id=102 bgcolor=#fefefe
| 285102 ||  || — || January 28, 1995 || Kitt Peak || Spacewatch || NYS || align=right data-sort-value="0.70" | 700 m || 
|-id=103 bgcolor=#fefefe
| 285103 ||  || — || January 29, 1995 || Kitt Peak || Spacewatch || — || align=right data-sort-value="0.62" | 620 m || 
|-id=104 bgcolor=#fefefe
| 285104 ||  || — || February 1, 1995 || Kitt Peak || Spacewatch || NYS || align=right data-sort-value="0.59" | 590 m || 
|-id=105 bgcolor=#d6d6d6
| 285105 ||  || — || February 1, 1995 || Kitt Peak || Spacewatch || — || align=right | 3.2 km || 
|-id=106 bgcolor=#d6d6d6
| 285106 ||  || — || March 25, 1995 || Kitt Peak || Spacewatch || — || align=right | 3.0 km || 
|-id=107 bgcolor=#fefefe
| 285107 ||  || — || April 25, 1995 || Kitt Peak || Spacewatch || V || align=right data-sort-value="0.84" | 840 m || 
|-id=108 bgcolor=#fefefe
| 285108 ||  || — || April 26, 1995 || Kitt Peak || Spacewatch || NYS || align=right data-sort-value="0.78" | 780 m || 
|-id=109 bgcolor=#d6d6d6
| 285109 ||  || — || May 1, 1995 || Kitt Peak || Spacewatch || VER || align=right | 4.7 km || 
|-id=110 bgcolor=#FFC2E0
| 285110 ||  || — || June 29, 1995 || Kitt Peak || Spacewatch || AMO +1km || align=right | 1.3 km || 
|-id=111 bgcolor=#d6d6d6
| 285111 ||  || — || June 29, 1995 || Kitt Peak || Spacewatch || — || align=right | 3.3 km || 
|-id=112 bgcolor=#E9E9E9
| 285112 ||  || — || June 29, 1995 || Kitt Peak || Spacewatch || — || align=right | 1.6 km || 
|-id=113 bgcolor=#E9E9E9
| 285113 ||  || — || July 22, 1995 || Kitt Peak || Spacewatch || — || align=right | 2.7 km || 
|-id=114 bgcolor=#d6d6d6
| 285114 ||  || — || July 27, 1995 || Kitt Peak || Spacewatch || — || align=right | 3.6 km || 
|-id=115 bgcolor=#E9E9E9
| 285115 ||  || — || August 17, 1995 || Kitt Peak || Spacewatch || — || align=right | 3.0 km || 
|-id=116 bgcolor=#fefefe
| 285116 ||  || — || September 18, 1995 || Modra || A. Galád || — || align=right data-sort-value="0.72" | 720 m || 
|-id=117 bgcolor=#fefefe
| 285117 ||  || — || September 17, 1995 || Kitt Peak || Spacewatch || V || align=right data-sort-value="0.75" | 750 m || 
|-id=118 bgcolor=#d6d6d6
| 285118 ||  || — || September 18, 1995 || Kitt Peak || Spacewatch || KOR || align=right | 1.3 km || 
|-id=119 bgcolor=#d6d6d6
| 285119 ||  || — || September 18, 1995 || Kitt Peak || Spacewatch || HYG || align=right | 2.4 km || 
|-id=120 bgcolor=#d6d6d6
| 285120 ||  || — || September 19, 1995 || Kitt Peak || Spacewatch || — || align=right | 2.2 km || 
|-id=121 bgcolor=#E9E9E9
| 285121 ||  || — || September 19, 1995 || Kitt Peak || Spacewatch || AEO || align=right | 1.3 km || 
|-id=122 bgcolor=#fefefe
| 285122 ||  || — || September 23, 1995 || Kitt Peak || Spacewatch || MAS || align=right data-sort-value="0.85" | 850 m || 
|-id=123 bgcolor=#fefefe
| 285123 ||  || — || September 25, 1995 || Kitt Peak || Spacewatch || MAS || align=right data-sort-value="0.97" | 970 m || 
|-id=124 bgcolor=#d6d6d6
| 285124 ||  || — || September 25, 1995 || Kitt Peak || Spacewatch || EOS || align=right | 2.0 km || 
|-id=125 bgcolor=#E9E9E9
| 285125 ||  || — || September 26, 1995 || Kitt Peak || Spacewatch || — || align=right data-sort-value="0.96" | 960 m || 
|-id=126 bgcolor=#d6d6d6
| 285126 ||  || — || September 21, 1995 || Kitt Peak || Spacewatch || CHA || align=right | 1.6 km || 
|-id=127 bgcolor=#d6d6d6
| 285127 ||  || — || September 26, 1995 || Kitt Peak || Spacewatch || EOS || align=right | 2.5 km || 
|-id=128 bgcolor=#E9E9E9
| 285128 ||  || — || September 26, 1995 || Kitt Peak || Spacewatch || — || align=right data-sort-value="0.93" | 930 m || 
|-id=129 bgcolor=#fefefe
| 285129 ||  || — || September 25, 1995 || Kitt Peak || Spacewatch || V || align=right data-sort-value="0.62" | 620 m || 
|-id=130 bgcolor=#fefefe
| 285130 ||  || — || September 25, 1995 || Kitt Peak || Spacewatch || NYS || align=right data-sort-value="0.74" | 740 m || 
|-id=131 bgcolor=#fefefe
| 285131 ||  || — || September 25, 1995 || Kitt Peak || Spacewatch || V || align=right data-sort-value="0.83" | 830 m || 
|-id=132 bgcolor=#fefefe
| 285132 ||  || — || September 26, 1995 || Kitt Peak || Spacewatch || — || align=right data-sort-value="0.61" | 610 m || 
|-id=133 bgcolor=#E9E9E9
| 285133 ||  || — || September 18, 1995 || Kitt Peak || Spacewatch || HOF || align=right | 3.0 km || 
|-id=134 bgcolor=#fefefe
| 285134 ||  || — || September 19, 1995 || Kitt Peak || Spacewatch || — || align=right | 1.1 km || 
|-id=135 bgcolor=#d6d6d6
| 285135 ||  || — || September 19, 1995 || Kitt Peak || Spacewatch || VER || align=right | 3.2 km || 
|-id=136 bgcolor=#d6d6d6
| 285136 ||  || — || September 20, 1995 || Kitt Peak || Spacewatch || — || align=right | 4.2 km || 
|-id=137 bgcolor=#d6d6d6
| 285137 ||  || — || September 29, 1995 || Kitt Peak || Spacewatch || THM || align=right | 1.9 km || 
|-id=138 bgcolor=#E9E9E9
| 285138 ||  || — || September 22, 1995 || Kitt Peak || Spacewatch || AST || align=right | 1.8 km || 
|-id=139 bgcolor=#d6d6d6
| 285139 ||  || — || September 26, 1995 || Kitt Peak || Spacewatch || LIX || align=right | 4.4 km || 
|-id=140 bgcolor=#fefefe
| 285140 ||  || — || October 1, 1995 || Kitt Peak || Spacewatch || NYS || align=right data-sort-value="0.83" | 830 m || 
|-id=141 bgcolor=#d6d6d6
| 285141 ||  || — || October 15, 1995 || Kitt Peak || Spacewatch || — || align=right | 4.4 km || 
|-id=142 bgcolor=#E9E9E9
| 285142 ||  || — || October 22, 1995 || Kleť || Kleť Obs. || — || align=right | 2.0 km || 
|-id=143 bgcolor=#fefefe
| 285143 ||  || — || October 23, 1995 || Xinglong || SCAP || H || align=right | 1.00 km || 
|-id=144 bgcolor=#fefefe
| 285144 ||  || — || October 17, 1995 || Kitt Peak || Spacewatch || FLO || align=right data-sort-value="0.78" | 780 m || 
|-id=145 bgcolor=#d6d6d6
| 285145 ||  || — || October 17, 1995 || Kitt Peak || Spacewatch || EOS || align=right | 2.0 km || 
|-id=146 bgcolor=#fefefe
| 285146 ||  || — || October 17, 1995 || Kitt Peak || Spacewatch || NYS || align=right data-sort-value="0.66" | 660 m || 
|-id=147 bgcolor=#E9E9E9
| 285147 ||  || — || October 18, 1995 || Kitt Peak || Spacewatch || — || align=right data-sort-value="0.88" | 880 m || 
|-id=148 bgcolor=#E9E9E9
| 285148 ||  || — || October 19, 1995 || Kitt Peak || Spacewatch || — || align=right | 1.2 km || 
|-id=149 bgcolor=#d6d6d6
| 285149 ||  || — || October 17, 1995 || Kitt Peak || Spacewatch || — || align=right | 5.5 km || 
|-id=150 bgcolor=#d6d6d6
| 285150 ||  || — || October 25, 1995 || Kitt Peak || Spacewatch || — || align=right | 2.5 km || 
|-id=151 bgcolor=#fefefe
| 285151 ||  || — || October 25, 1995 || Kitt Peak || Spacewatch || — || align=right data-sort-value="0.68" | 680 m || 
|-id=152 bgcolor=#E9E9E9
| 285152 ||  || — || October 27, 1995 || Kitt Peak || Spacewatch || GEF || align=right | 1.7 km || 
|-id=153 bgcolor=#d6d6d6
| 285153 ||  || — || October 19, 1995 || Kitt Peak || Spacewatch || — || align=right | 3.7 km || 
|-id=154 bgcolor=#d6d6d6
| 285154 ||  || — || October 22, 1995 || Kitt Peak || Spacewatch || — || align=right | 3.1 km || 
|-id=155 bgcolor=#fefefe
| 285155 ||  || — || November 14, 1995 || Kitt Peak || Spacewatch || V || align=right data-sort-value="0.85" | 850 m || 
|-id=156 bgcolor=#fefefe
| 285156 ||  || — || November 14, 1995 || Kitt Peak || Spacewatch || — || align=right | 1.0 km || 
|-id=157 bgcolor=#E9E9E9
| 285157 ||  || — || November 15, 1995 || Kitt Peak || Spacewatch || — || align=right | 2.3 km || 
|-id=158 bgcolor=#d6d6d6
| 285158 ||  || — || November 15, 1995 || Kitt Peak || Spacewatch || — || align=right | 3.1 km || 
|-id=159 bgcolor=#d6d6d6
| 285159 ||  || — || November 15, 1995 || Kitt Peak || Spacewatch || — || align=right | 3.0 km || 
|-id=160 bgcolor=#FA8072
| 285160 ||  || — || November 21, 1995 || Kitt Peak || Spacewatch || — || align=right data-sort-value="0.71" | 710 m || 
|-id=161 bgcolor=#d6d6d6
| 285161 ||  || — || November 16, 1995 || Kitt Peak || Spacewatch || BRA || align=right | 1.9 km || 
|-id=162 bgcolor=#E9E9E9
| 285162 ||  || — || November 16, 1995 || Kitt Peak || Spacewatch || — || align=right | 1.1 km || 
|-id=163 bgcolor=#d6d6d6
| 285163 ||  || — || November 17, 1995 || Kitt Peak || Spacewatch || — || align=right | 3.5 km || 
|-id=164 bgcolor=#fefefe
| 285164 ||  || — || November 21, 1995 || Kitt Peak || Spacewatch || — || align=right data-sort-value="0.59" | 590 m || 
|-id=165 bgcolor=#E9E9E9
| 285165 ||  || — || December 14, 1995 || Kitt Peak || Spacewatch || — || align=right | 1.3 km || 
|-id=166 bgcolor=#E9E9E9
| 285166 ||  || — || December 18, 1995 || Kitt Peak || Spacewatch || — || align=right data-sort-value="0.98" | 980 m || 
|-id=167 bgcolor=#E9E9E9
| 285167 ||  || — || December 18, 1995 || Kitt Peak || Spacewatch || — || align=right | 1.3 km || 
|-id=168 bgcolor=#E9E9E9
| 285168 ||  || — || December 20, 1995 || Kitt Peak || Spacewatch || — || align=right | 1.7 km || 
|-id=169 bgcolor=#fefefe
| 285169 ||  || — || January 12, 1996 || Kitt Peak || Spacewatch || NYS || align=right | 1.6 km || 
|-id=170 bgcolor=#fefefe
| 285170 ||  || — || January 19, 1996 || Kitt Peak || Spacewatch || MAS || align=right data-sort-value="0.71" | 710 m || 
|-id=171 bgcolor=#E9E9E9
| 285171 ||  || — || March 11, 1996 || Kitt Peak || Spacewatch || — || align=right | 1.8 km || 
|-id=172 bgcolor=#d6d6d6
| 285172 ||  || — || March 11, 1996 || Kitt Peak || Spacewatch || — || align=right | 3.0 km || 
|-id=173 bgcolor=#E9E9E9
| 285173 ||  || — || March 12, 1996 || Kitt Peak || Spacewatch || — || align=right | 2.0 km || 
|-id=174 bgcolor=#E9E9E9
| 285174 ||  || — || March 17, 1996 || Kitt Peak || Spacewatch || — || align=right | 3.2 km || 
|-id=175 bgcolor=#d6d6d6
| 285175 ||  || — || April 9, 1996 || Kitt Peak || Spacewatch || — || align=right | 2.4 km || 
|-id=176 bgcolor=#E9E9E9
| 285176 ||  || — || April 12, 1996 || Kitt Peak || Spacewatch || — || align=right | 2.1 km || 
|-id=177 bgcolor=#E9E9E9
| 285177 ||  || — || April 13, 1996 || Kitt Peak || Spacewatch || — || align=right | 2.3 km || 
|-id=178 bgcolor=#E9E9E9
| 285178 || 1996 OZ || — || July 18, 1996 || Socorro || R. Weber || — || align=right | 4.0 km || 
|-id=179 bgcolor=#FFC2E0
| 285179 ||  || — || October 15, 1996 || Kitt Peak || Spacewatch || APO || align=right data-sort-value="0.51" | 510 m || 
|-id=180 bgcolor=#C2FFFF
| 285180 ||  || — || October 4, 1996 || Kitt Peak || Spacewatch || L4 || align=right | 11 km || 
|-id=181 bgcolor=#d6d6d6
| 285181 ||  || — || October 4, 1996 || Kitt Peak || Spacewatch || — || align=right | 3.0 km || 
|-id=182 bgcolor=#E9E9E9
| 285182 ||  || — || October 4, 1996 || Kitt Peak || Spacewatch || — || align=right | 3.1 km || 
|-id=183 bgcolor=#E9E9E9
| 285183 ||  || — || October 7, 1996 || Kitt Peak || Spacewatch || PAD || align=right | 2.2 km || 
|-id=184 bgcolor=#fefefe
| 285184 ||  || — || October 11, 1996 || Kitt Peak || Spacewatch || — || align=right data-sort-value="0.80" | 800 m || 
|-id=185 bgcolor=#d6d6d6
| 285185 ||  || — || October 12, 1996 || Kitt Peak || Spacewatch || — || align=right | 2.7 km || 
|-id=186 bgcolor=#E9E9E9
| 285186 ||  || — || October 8, 1996 || La Silla || E. W. Elst || — || align=right | 3.0 km || 
|-id=187 bgcolor=#fefefe
| 285187 ||  || — || October 10, 1996 || Kitt Peak || Spacewatch || NYS || align=right data-sort-value="0.78" | 780 m || 
|-id=188 bgcolor=#d6d6d6
| 285188 ||  || — || November 3, 1996 || Kitt Peak || Spacewatch || — || align=right | 3.6 km || 
|-id=189 bgcolor=#d6d6d6
| 285189 ||  || — || November 4, 1996 || Kitt Peak || Spacewatch || — || align=right | 3.6 km || 
|-id=190 bgcolor=#fefefe
| 285190 ||  || — || November 4, 1996 || Kitt Peak || Spacewatch || V || align=right data-sort-value="0.80" | 800 m || 
|-id=191 bgcolor=#d6d6d6
| 285191 ||  || — || November 5, 1996 || Kitt Peak || Spacewatch || — || align=right | 4.1 km || 
|-id=192 bgcolor=#fefefe
| 285192 ||  || — || November 5, 1996 || Kitt Peak || Spacewatch || — || align=right data-sort-value="0.75" | 750 m || 
|-id=193 bgcolor=#E9E9E9
| 285193 ||  || — || November 6, 1996 || Kitt Peak || Spacewatch || HEN || align=right | 1.2 km || 
|-id=194 bgcolor=#d6d6d6
| 285194 ||  || — || November 6, 1996 || Kitt Peak || Spacewatch || — || align=right | 4.9 km || 
|-id=195 bgcolor=#d6d6d6
| 285195 ||  || — || November 9, 1996 || Kitt Peak || Spacewatch || — || align=right | 3.6 km || 
|-id=196 bgcolor=#d6d6d6
| 285196 ||  || — || November 13, 1996 || Kitt Peak || Spacewatch || — || align=right | 3.1 km || 
|-id=197 bgcolor=#E9E9E9
| 285197 ||  || — || November 8, 1996 || Kitt Peak || Spacewatch || AEO || align=right | 1.4 km || 
|-id=198 bgcolor=#fefefe
| 285198 ||  || — || November 8, 1996 || Kitt Peak || Spacewatch || — || align=right | 1.0 km || 
|-id=199 bgcolor=#fefefe
| 285199 ||  || — || December 6, 1996 || Kitt Peak || Spacewatch || — || align=right | 1.1 km || 
|-id=200 bgcolor=#d6d6d6
| 285200 ||  || — || December 1, 1996 || Kitt Peak || Spacewatch || — || align=right | 3.4 km || 
|}

285201–285300 

|-bgcolor=#E9E9E9
| 285201 ||  || — || December 1, 1996 || Kitt Peak || Spacewatch || — || align=right | 2.7 km || 
|-id=202 bgcolor=#fefefe
| 285202 ||  || — || December 1, 1996 || Kitt Peak || Spacewatch || SUL || align=right | 2.1 km || 
|-id=203 bgcolor=#fefefe
| 285203 ||  || — || December 4, 1996 || Kitt Peak || Spacewatch || MAS || align=right data-sort-value="0.55" | 550 m || 
|-id=204 bgcolor=#fefefe
| 285204 ||  || — || December 4, 1996 || Kitt Peak || Spacewatch || — || align=right | 1.4 km || 
|-id=205 bgcolor=#E9E9E9
| 285205 ||  || — || December 7, 1996 || Kitt Peak || Spacewatch || — || align=right | 1.7 km || 
|-id=206 bgcolor=#E9E9E9
| 285206 ||  || — || December 5, 1996 || Kitt Peak || Spacewatch || — || align=right | 1.3 km || 
|-id=207 bgcolor=#fefefe
| 285207 ||  || — || December 1, 1996 || Kitt Peak || Spacewatch || V || align=right data-sort-value="0.82" | 820 m || 
|-id=208 bgcolor=#E9E9E9
| 285208 ||  || — || December 5, 1996 || Kitt Peak || Spacewatch || — || align=right | 1.2 km || 
|-id=209 bgcolor=#d6d6d6
| 285209 ||  || — || December 9, 1996 || Kitt Peak || Spacewatch || URS || align=right | 4.1 km || 
|-id=210 bgcolor=#fefefe
| 285210 ||  || — || January 31, 1997 || Kitt Peak || Spacewatch || — || align=right | 1.3 km || 
|-id=211 bgcolor=#d6d6d6
| 285211 ||  || — || January 31, 1997 || Kitt Peak || Spacewatch || — || align=right | 3.7 km || 
|-id=212 bgcolor=#fefefe
| 285212 ||  || — || February 3, 1997 || Kitt Peak || Spacewatch || FLO || align=right data-sort-value="0.73" | 730 m || 
|-id=213 bgcolor=#fefefe
| 285213 ||  || — || March 2, 1997 || Kitt Peak || Spacewatch || — || align=right | 1.0 km || 
|-id=214 bgcolor=#E9E9E9
| 285214 ||  || — || March 2, 1997 || Kitt Peak || Spacewatch || JUN || align=right | 1.8 km || 
|-id=215 bgcolor=#E9E9E9
| 285215 ||  || — || March 6, 1997 || Prescott || P. G. Comba || GER || align=right | 2.8 km || 
|-id=216 bgcolor=#d6d6d6
| 285216 ||  || — || March 2, 1997 || Kitt Peak || Spacewatch || — || align=right | 3.4 km || 
|-id=217 bgcolor=#fefefe
| 285217 ||  || — || March 7, 1997 || Kitt Peak || Spacewatch || — || align=right | 1.1 km || 
|-id=218 bgcolor=#d6d6d6
| 285218 ||  || — || April 7, 1997 || Kitt Peak || Spacewatch || — || align=right | 2.6 km || 
|-id=219 bgcolor=#d6d6d6
| 285219 ||  || — || April 9, 1997 || Kitt Peak || Spacewatch || — || align=right | 2.8 km || 
|-id=220 bgcolor=#d6d6d6
| 285220 ||  || — || May 5, 1997 || Mauna Kea || C. Veillet || — || align=right | 3.2 km || 
|-id=221 bgcolor=#d6d6d6
| 285221 ||  || — || May 28, 1997 || Kitt Peak || Spacewatch || — || align=right | 3.1 km || 
|-id=222 bgcolor=#d6d6d6
| 285222 ||  || — || May 28, 1997 || Kitt Peak || Spacewatch || — || align=right | 3.2 km || 
|-id=223 bgcolor=#C2FFFF
| 285223 ||  || — || June 29, 1997 || Kitt Peak || Spacewatch || L5 || align=right | 13 km || 
|-id=224 bgcolor=#d6d6d6
| 285224 ||  || — || July 3, 1997 || Kitt Peak || Spacewatch || — || align=right | 3.5 km || 
|-id=225 bgcolor=#d6d6d6
| 285225 ||  || — || July 6, 1997 || Kitt Peak || Spacewatch || — || align=right | 4.4 km || 
|-id=226 bgcolor=#E9E9E9
| 285226 ||  || — || August 31, 1997 || Kleť || Z. Moravec || — || align=right | 2.9 km || 
|-id=227 bgcolor=#E9E9E9
| 285227 ||  || — || September 27, 1997 || Kitt Peak || Spacewatch || IAN || align=right | 1.6 km || 
|-id=228 bgcolor=#C2FFFF
| 285228 ||  || — || September 27, 1997 || Kitt Peak || Spacewatch || L4 || align=right | 8.0 km || 
|-id=229 bgcolor=#fefefe
| 285229 ||  || — || September 28, 1997 || Kitt Peak || Spacewatch || FLO || align=right data-sort-value="0.83" | 830 m || 
|-id=230 bgcolor=#E9E9E9
| 285230 ||  || — || September 28, 1997 || Kitt Peak || Spacewatch || — || align=right | 1.9 km || 
|-id=231 bgcolor=#fefefe
| 285231 ||  || — || September 28, 1997 || Kitt Peak || Spacewatch || NYS || align=right data-sort-value="0.64" | 640 m || 
|-id=232 bgcolor=#C2FFFF
| 285232 ||  || — || September 29, 1997 || Kitt Peak || Spacewatch || L4 || align=right | 8.6 km || 
|-id=233 bgcolor=#d6d6d6
| 285233 ||  || — || September 29, 1997 || Kitt Peak || Spacewatch || HIL3:2 || align=right | 6.9 km || 
|-id=234 bgcolor=#d6d6d6
| 285234 ||  || — || September 29, 1997 || Kitt Peak || Spacewatch || — || align=right | 3.1 km || 
|-id=235 bgcolor=#E9E9E9
| 285235 ||  || — || October 2, 1997 || Caussols || ODAS || — || align=right | 3.1 km || 
|-id=236 bgcolor=#C2FFFF
| 285236 ||  || — || October 2, 1997 || Kitt Peak || Spacewatch || L4ARK || align=right | 9.5 km || 
|-id=237 bgcolor=#d6d6d6
| 285237 ||  || — || October 2, 1997 || Kitt Peak || Spacewatch || — || align=right | 2.5 km || 
|-id=238 bgcolor=#E9E9E9
| 285238 ||  || — || November 22, 1997 || Kitt Peak || Spacewatch || EUN || align=right | 1.1 km || 
|-id=239 bgcolor=#fefefe
| 285239 ||  || — || November 22, 1997 || Kitt Peak || Spacewatch || — || align=right | 1.2 km || 
|-id=240 bgcolor=#fefefe
| 285240 ||  || — || November 23, 1997 || Kitt Peak || Spacewatch || MAS || align=right data-sort-value="0.59" | 590 m || 
|-id=241 bgcolor=#fefefe
| 285241 ||  || — || November 28, 1997 || Kitt Peak || Spacewatch || — || align=right data-sort-value="0.91" | 910 m || 
|-id=242 bgcolor=#d6d6d6
| 285242 ||  || — || November 28, 1997 || Kitt Peak || Spacewatch || — || align=right | 4.4 km || 
|-id=243 bgcolor=#fefefe
| 285243 ||  || — || December 29, 1997 || Kitt Peak || Spacewatch || — || align=right data-sort-value="0.88" | 880 m || 
|-id=244 bgcolor=#fefefe
| 285244 ||  || — || January 18, 1998 || Kitt Peak || Spacewatch || — || align=right data-sort-value="0.75" | 750 m || 
|-id=245 bgcolor=#E9E9E9
| 285245 ||  || — || January 22, 1998 || Kitt Peak || Spacewatch || — || align=right | 2.1 km || 
|-id=246 bgcolor=#d6d6d6
| 285246 ||  || — || January 26, 1998 || Kitt Peak || Spacewatch || — || align=right | 2.9 km || 
|-id=247 bgcolor=#d6d6d6
| 285247 ||  || — || January 26, 1998 || Kitt Peak || Spacewatch || — || align=right | 3.8 km || 
|-id=248 bgcolor=#fefefe
| 285248 ||  || — || February 17, 1998 || Kitt Peak || Spacewatch || — || align=right | 1.0 km || 
|-id=249 bgcolor=#E9E9E9
| 285249 ||  || — || February 22, 1998 || Kitt Peak || Spacewatch || HNA || align=right | 2.4 km || 
|-id=250 bgcolor=#fefefe
| 285250 ||  || — || February 21, 1998 || Xinglong || SCAP || ERI || align=right | 1.9 km || 
|-id=251 bgcolor=#E9E9E9
| 285251 ||  || — || February 24, 1998 || Kitt Peak || Spacewatch || KON || align=right | 2.5 km || 
|-id=252 bgcolor=#fefefe
| 285252 ||  || — || March 25, 1998 || Socorro || LINEAR || — || align=right | 2.7 km || 
|-id=253 bgcolor=#fefefe
| 285253 ||  || — || April 17, 1998 || Kitt Peak || Spacewatch || MAS || align=right data-sort-value="0.94" | 940 m || 
|-id=254 bgcolor=#fefefe
| 285254 ||  || — || April 19, 1998 || Kitt Peak || Spacewatch || — || align=right data-sort-value="0.57" | 570 m || 
|-id=255 bgcolor=#d6d6d6
| 285255 ||  || — || April 20, 1998 || Kitt Peak || Spacewatch || — || align=right | 4.1 km || 
|-id=256 bgcolor=#E9E9E9
| 285256 ||  || — || April 19, 1998 || Kitt Peak || Spacewatch || — || align=right | 1.3 km || 
|-id=257 bgcolor=#fefefe
| 285257 ||  || — || April 18, 1998 || Kitt Peak || Spacewatch || — || align=right data-sort-value="0.83" | 830 m || 
|-id=258 bgcolor=#fefefe
| 285258 ||  || — || April 21, 1998 || Socorro || LINEAR || — || align=right | 1.7 km || 
|-id=259 bgcolor=#d6d6d6
| 285259 ||  || — || April 23, 1998 || Socorro || LINEAR || — || align=right | 4.9 km || 
|-id=260 bgcolor=#d6d6d6
| 285260 ||  || — || May 28, 1998 || Kitt Peak || Spacewatch || EUP || align=right | 6.8 km || 
|-id=261 bgcolor=#d6d6d6
| 285261 ||  || — || June 18, 1998 || Kitt Peak || Spacewatch || — || align=right | 4.5 km || 
|-id=262 bgcolor=#E9E9E9
| 285262 ||  || — || June 27, 1998 || Kitt Peak || Spacewatch || EUN || align=right | 1.3 km || 
|-id=263 bgcolor=#FFC2E0
| 285263 ||  || — || August 19, 1998 || Socorro || LINEAR || AMO +1kmPHAmoon || align=right | 1.3 km || 
|-id=264 bgcolor=#fefefe
| 285264 ||  || — || August 22, 1998 || Xinglong || SCAP || — || align=right data-sort-value="0.92" | 920 m || 
|-id=265 bgcolor=#FA8072
| 285265 ||  || — || August 24, 1998 || Socorro || LINEAR || — || align=right data-sort-value="0.82" | 820 m || 
|-id=266 bgcolor=#fefefe
| 285266 ||  || — || August 23, 1998 || Anderson Mesa || LONEOS || H || align=right | 1.1 km || 
|-id=267 bgcolor=#E9E9E9
| 285267 ||  || — || August 24, 1998 || Socorro || LINEAR || TIN || align=right | 2.2 km || 
|-id=268 bgcolor=#d6d6d6
| 285268 ||  || — || August 30, 1998 || Kitt Peak || Spacewatch || — || align=right | 3.5 km || 
|-id=269 bgcolor=#d6d6d6
| 285269 ||  || — || August 24, 1998 || Socorro || LINEAR || — || align=right | 4.7 km || 
|-id=270 bgcolor=#E9E9E9
| 285270 ||  || — || August 24, 1998 || Socorro || LINEAR || — || align=right | 1.7 km || 
|-id=271 bgcolor=#E9E9E9
| 285271 ||  || — || September 12, 1998 || Kitt Peak || Spacewatch || — || align=right | 3.0 km || 
|-id=272 bgcolor=#d6d6d6
| 285272 ||  || — || September 13, 1998 || Kitt Peak || Spacewatch || — || align=right | 3.6 km || 
|-id=273 bgcolor=#d6d6d6
| 285273 ||  || — || September 14, 1998 || Kitt Peak || Spacewatch || VER || align=right | 3.8 km || 
|-id=274 bgcolor=#fefefe
| 285274 ||  || — || September 14, 1998 || Kitt Peak || Spacewatch || — || align=right data-sort-value="0.87" | 870 m || 
|-id=275 bgcolor=#E9E9E9
| 285275 ||  || — || September 14, 1998 || Socorro || LINEAR || JUN || align=right | 1.5 km || 
|-id=276 bgcolor=#E9E9E9
| 285276 ||  || — || September 14, 1998 || Socorro || LINEAR || — || align=right | 1.8 km || 
|-id=277 bgcolor=#E9E9E9
| 285277 ||  || — || September 14, 1998 || Socorro || LINEAR || JUN || align=right | 1.3 km || 
|-id=278 bgcolor=#E9E9E9
| 285278 ||  || — || September 19, 1998 || Kitt Peak || Spacewatch || — || align=right | 2.0 km || 
|-id=279 bgcolor=#E9E9E9
| 285279 ||  || — || September 17, 1998 || Anderson Mesa || LONEOS || JUN || align=right | 1.5 km || 
|-id=280 bgcolor=#fefefe
| 285280 ||  || — || September 24, 1998 || Woomera || F. B. Zoltowski || ERI || align=right | 2.0 km || 
|-id=281 bgcolor=#fefefe
| 285281 ||  || — || September 18, 1998 || Socorro || LINEAR || H || align=right data-sort-value="0.84" | 840 m || 
|-id=282 bgcolor=#fefefe
| 285282 ||  || — || September 19, 1998 || Socorro || LINEAR || H || align=right data-sort-value="0.84" | 840 m || 
|-id=283 bgcolor=#fefefe
| 285283 ||  || — || September 18, 1998 || Kitt Peak || Spacewatch || — || align=right data-sort-value="0.73" | 730 m || 
|-id=284 bgcolor=#fefefe
| 285284 ||  || — || September 26, 1998 || Kitt Peak || Spacewatch || — || align=right data-sort-value="0.95" | 950 m || 
|-id=285 bgcolor=#fefefe
| 285285 ||  || — || September 29, 1998 || Xinglong || SCAP || — || align=right data-sort-value="0.96" | 960 m || 
|-id=286 bgcolor=#E9E9E9
| 285286 ||  || — || September 19, 1998 || Socorro || LINEAR || MAR || align=right | 1.8 km || 
|-id=287 bgcolor=#fefefe
| 285287 ||  || — || September 26, 1998 || Socorro || LINEAR || — || align=right data-sort-value="0.90" | 900 m || 
|-id=288 bgcolor=#fefefe
| 285288 ||  || — || September 26, 1998 || Socorro || LINEAR || MAS || align=right | 1.0 km || 
|-id=289 bgcolor=#fefefe
| 285289 ||  || — || September 26, 1998 || Socorro || LINEAR || — || align=right data-sort-value="0.95" | 950 m || 
|-id=290 bgcolor=#FA8072
| 285290 ||  || — || September 23, 1998 || Socorro || LINEAR || — || align=right data-sort-value="0.98" | 980 m || 
|-id=291 bgcolor=#fefefe
| 285291 ||  || — || September 26, 1998 || Socorro || LINEAR || — || align=right data-sort-value="0.75" | 750 m || 
|-id=292 bgcolor=#E9E9E9
| 285292 ||  || — || September 26, 1998 || Socorro || LINEAR || — || align=right | 1.0 km || 
|-id=293 bgcolor=#fefefe
| 285293 ||  || — || September 19, 1998 || Apache Point || SDSS || — || align=right data-sort-value="0.74" | 740 m || 
|-id=294 bgcolor=#fefefe
| 285294 ||  || — || September 19, 1998 || Apache Point || SDSS || — || align=right data-sort-value="0.75" | 750 m || 
|-id=295 bgcolor=#E9E9E9
| 285295 ||  || — || October 13, 1998 || Kitt Peak || Spacewatch || — || align=right | 1.9 km || 
|-id=296 bgcolor=#d6d6d6
| 285296 ||  || — || October 13, 1998 || Kitt Peak || Spacewatch || EOS || align=right | 2.7 km || 
|-id=297 bgcolor=#E9E9E9
| 285297 ||  || — || October 13, 1998 || Kitt Peak || Spacewatch || — || align=right | 1.6 km || 
|-id=298 bgcolor=#E9E9E9
| 285298 ||  || — || October 13, 1998 || Kitt Peak || Spacewatch || — || align=right | 2.0 km || 
|-id=299 bgcolor=#E9E9E9
| 285299 ||  || — || October 14, 1998 || Višnjan Observatory || K. Korlević || IAN || align=right | 1.7 km || 
|-id=300 bgcolor=#E9E9E9
| 285300 ||  || — || October 14, 1998 || Caussols || ODAS || — || align=right | 2.6 km || 
|}

285301–285400 

|-bgcolor=#E9E9E9
| 285301 ||  || — || October 12, 1998 || Kitt Peak || Spacewatch || — || align=right | 1.9 km || 
|-id=302 bgcolor=#fefefe
| 285302 ||  || — || October 17, 1998 || Kitt Peak || Spacewatch || FLO || align=right data-sort-value="0.70" | 700 m || 
|-id=303 bgcolor=#d6d6d6
| 285303 ||  || — || October 24, 1998 || Kitt Peak || Spacewatch || — || align=right | 3.0 km || 
|-id=304 bgcolor=#fefefe
| 285304 ||  || — || November 10, 1998 || Caussols || ODAS || — || align=right data-sort-value="0.78" | 780 m || 
|-id=305 bgcolor=#fefefe
| 285305 ||  || — || November 14, 1998 || Kitt Peak || Spacewatch || — || align=right data-sort-value="0.67" | 670 m || 
|-id=306 bgcolor=#fefefe
| 285306 ||  || — || November 14, 1998 || Kitt Peak || Spacewatch || — || align=right data-sort-value="0.61" | 610 m || 
|-id=307 bgcolor=#E9E9E9
| 285307 ||  || — || November 21, 1998 || Kitt Peak || Spacewatch || — || align=right | 2.4 km || 
|-id=308 bgcolor=#fefefe
| 285308 ||  || — || November 21, 1998 || Kitt Peak || Spacewatch || MAS || align=right data-sort-value="0.88" | 880 m || 
|-id=309 bgcolor=#E9E9E9
| 285309 ||  || — || November 21, 1998 || Kitt Peak || Spacewatch || — || align=right | 1.6 km || 
|-id=310 bgcolor=#fefefe
| 285310 ||  || — || December 8, 1998 || Kitt Peak || Spacewatch || NYS || align=right data-sort-value="0.71" | 710 m || 
|-id=311 bgcolor=#fefefe
| 285311 ||  || — || December 8, 1998 || Kitt Peak || Spacewatch || — || align=right data-sort-value="0.86" | 860 m || 
|-id=312 bgcolor=#fefefe
| 285312 ||  || — || December 15, 1998 || Caussols || ODAS || — || align=right data-sort-value="0.83" | 830 m || 
|-id=313 bgcolor=#d6d6d6
| 285313 ||  || — || December 8, 1998 || Kitt Peak || Spacewatch || — || align=right | 4.0 km || 
|-id=314 bgcolor=#E9E9E9
| 285314 ||  || — || December 10, 1998 || Kitt Peak || Spacewatch || — || align=right | 2.3 km || 
|-id=315 bgcolor=#E9E9E9
| 285315 ||  || — || December 16, 1998 || Kitt Peak || Spacewatch || — || align=right | 1.2 km || 
|-id=316 bgcolor=#fefefe
| 285316 ||  || — || December 22, 1998 || Kitt Peak || Spacewatch || — || align=right | 1.1 km || 
|-id=317 bgcolor=#E9E9E9
| 285317 ||  || — || December 26, 1998 || Kitt Peak || Spacewatch || — || align=right | 2.3 km || 
|-id=318 bgcolor=#d6d6d6
| 285318 ||  || — || January 19, 1999 || Kitt Peak || Spacewatch || THM || align=right | 2.3 km || 
|-id=319 bgcolor=#d6d6d6
| 285319 ||  || — || January 19, 1999 || Kitt Peak || Spacewatch || 7:4 || align=right | 4.4 km || 
|-id=320 bgcolor=#E9E9E9
| 285320 ||  || — || February 12, 1999 || Socorro || LINEAR || — || align=right | 3.1 km || 
|-id=321 bgcolor=#d6d6d6
| 285321 ||  || — || February 10, 1999 || Socorro || LINEAR || — || align=right | 3.3 km || 
|-id=322 bgcolor=#E9E9E9
| 285322 ||  || — || February 7, 1999 || Kitt Peak || Spacewatch || — || align=right | 1.1 km || 
|-id=323 bgcolor=#E9E9E9
| 285323 ||  || — || February 9, 1999 || Kitt Peak || Spacewatch || — || align=right | 1.4 km || 
|-id=324 bgcolor=#d6d6d6
| 285324 ||  || — || February 9, 1999 || Kitt Peak || Spacewatch || HYG || align=right | 2.5 km || 
|-id=325 bgcolor=#fefefe
| 285325 ||  || — || March 13, 1999 || Kitt Peak || Spacewatch || FLO || align=right data-sort-value="0.81" | 810 m || 
|-id=326 bgcolor=#d6d6d6
| 285326 ||  || — || March 14, 1999 || Kitt Peak || Spacewatch || — || align=right | 3.6 km || 
|-id=327 bgcolor=#fefefe
| 285327 ||  || — || March 10, 1999 || Kitt Peak || Spacewatch || FLO || align=right data-sort-value="0.56" | 560 m || 
|-id=328 bgcolor=#E9E9E9
| 285328 ||  || — || March 17, 1999 || Kitt Peak || Spacewatch || — || align=right | 2.6 km || 
|-id=329 bgcolor=#d6d6d6
| 285329 ||  || — || March 23, 1999 || Kitt Peak || Spacewatch || THM || align=right | 2.6 km || 
|-id=330 bgcolor=#fefefe
| 285330 ||  || — || March 23, 1999 || Kitt Peak || Spacewatch || — || align=right data-sort-value="0.67" | 670 m || 
|-id=331 bgcolor=#FFC2E0
| 285331 ||  || — || March 31, 1999 || Anderson Mesa || LONEOS || APO +1km || align=right data-sort-value="0.65" | 650 m || 
|-id=332 bgcolor=#E9E9E9
| 285332 ||  || — || March 20, 1999 || Apache Point || SDSS || NEM || align=right | 2.2 km || 
|-id=333 bgcolor=#E9E9E9
| 285333 ||  || — || March 20, 1999 || Apache Point || SDSS || — || align=right | 1.3 km || 
|-id=334 bgcolor=#E9E9E9
| 285334 ||  || — || March 20, 1999 || Apache Point || SDSS || JUN || align=right | 1.3 km || 
|-id=335 bgcolor=#fefefe
| 285335 ||  || — || March 21, 1999 || Apache Point || SDSS || MAS || align=right data-sort-value="0.82" | 820 m || 
|-id=336 bgcolor=#E9E9E9
| 285336 ||  || — || March 21, 1999 || Apache Point || SDSS || — || align=right | 3.7 km || 
|-id=337 bgcolor=#d6d6d6
| 285337 ||  || — || April 9, 1999 || Kitt Peak || Spacewatch || — || align=right | 3.5 km || 
|-id=338 bgcolor=#fefefe
| 285338 ||  || — || May 10, 1999 || Socorro || LINEAR || PHO || align=right | 1.6 km || 
|-id=339 bgcolor=#FFC2E0
| 285339 ||  || — || May 10, 1999 || Socorro || LINEAR || APO +1km || align=right data-sort-value="0.61" | 610 m || 
|-id=340 bgcolor=#d6d6d6
| 285340 ||  || — || June 6, 1999 || Kitt Peak || Spacewatch || EUP || align=right | 3.7 km || 
|-id=341 bgcolor=#d6d6d6
| 285341 ||  || — || June 9, 1999 || Socorro || LINEAR || — || align=right | 4.0 km || 
|-id=342 bgcolor=#fefefe
| 285342 ||  || — || September 3, 1999 || Kitt Peak || Spacewatch || MAS || align=right data-sort-value="0.70" | 700 m || 
|-id=343 bgcolor=#d6d6d6
| 285343 ||  || — || September 3, 1999 || Kitt Peak || Spacewatch || EOS || align=right | 2.6 km || 
|-id=344 bgcolor=#d6d6d6
| 285344 ||  || — || September 7, 1999 || Socorro || LINEAR || — || align=right | 3.2 km || 
|-id=345 bgcolor=#fefefe
| 285345 ||  || — || September 8, 1999 || Socorro || LINEAR || PHO || align=right | 2.3 km || 
|-id=346 bgcolor=#fefefe
| 285346 ||  || — || September 7, 1999 || Socorro || LINEAR || — || align=right | 1.1 km || 
|-id=347 bgcolor=#fefefe
| 285347 ||  || — || September 7, 1999 || Socorro || LINEAR || MAS || align=right data-sort-value="0.87" | 870 m || 
|-id=348 bgcolor=#fefefe
| 285348 ||  || — || September 7, 1999 || Socorro || LINEAR || — || align=right | 1.00 km || 
|-id=349 bgcolor=#E9E9E9
| 285349 ||  || — || September 8, 1999 || Socorro || LINEAR || — || align=right | 3.4 km || 
|-id=350 bgcolor=#d6d6d6
| 285350 ||  || — || September 9, 1999 || Socorro || LINEAR || — || align=right | 5.4 km || 
|-id=351 bgcolor=#E9E9E9
| 285351 ||  || — || September 13, 1999 || Kitt Peak || Spacewatch || — || align=right | 1.6 km || 
|-id=352 bgcolor=#E9E9E9
| 285352 ||  || — || September 9, 1999 || Socorro || LINEAR || — || align=right | 1.9 km || 
|-id=353 bgcolor=#E9E9E9
| 285353 ||  || — || September 9, 1999 || Socorro || LINEAR || ADE || align=right | 4.0 km || 
|-id=354 bgcolor=#E9E9E9
| 285354 ||  || — || September 9, 1999 || Socorro || LINEAR || — || align=right | 3.8 km || 
|-id=355 bgcolor=#d6d6d6
| 285355 ||  || — || September 8, 1999 || Socorro || LINEAR || — || align=right | 3.4 km || 
|-id=356 bgcolor=#fefefe
| 285356 ||  || — || September 8, 1999 || Catalina || CSS || — || align=right | 1.2 km || 
|-id=357 bgcolor=#E9E9E9
| 285357 ||  || — || September 9, 1999 || Socorro || LINEAR || — || align=right | 1.6 km || 
|-id=358 bgcolor=#fefefe
| 285358 ||  || — || September 7, 1999 || Catalina || CSS || — || align=right | 1.2 km || 
|-id=359 bgcolor=#fefefe
| 285359 ||  || — || October 4, 1999 || Kitt Peak || Spacewatch || NYS || align=right data-sort-value="0.79" | 790 m || 
|-id=360 bgcolor=#fefefe
| 285360 ||  || — || October 4, 1999 || Socorro || LINEAR || — || align=right data-sort-value="0.91" | 910 m || 
|-id=361 bgcolor=#E9E9E9
| 285361 ||  || — || October 3, 1999 || Kitt Peak || Spacewatch || — || align=right | 1.5 km || 
|-id=362 bgcolor=#fefefe
| 285362 ||  || — || October 6, 1999 || Kitt Peak || Spacewatch || — || align=right data-sort-value="0.72" | 720 m || 
|-id=363 bgcolor=#E9E9E9
| 285363 ||  || — || October 6, 1999 || Kitt Peak || Spacewatch || — || align=right | 2.2 km || 
|-id=364 bgcolor=#fefefe
| 285364 ||  || — || October 7, 1999 || Kitt Peak || Spacewatch || — || align=right data-sort-value="0.77" | 770 m || 
|-id=365 bgcolor=#fefefe
| 285365 ||  || — || October 8, 1999 || Kitt Peak || Spacewatch || NYS || align=right data-sort-value="0.79" | 790 m || 
|-id=366 bgcolor=#fefefe
| 285366 ||  || — || October 8, 1999 || Kitt Peak || Spacewatch || NYS || align=right data-sort-value="0.64" | 640 m || 
|-id=367 bgcolor=#d6d6d6
| 285367 ||  || — || October 8, 1999 || Kitt Peak || Spacewatch || 3:2 || align=right | 4.7 km || 
|-id=368 bgcolor=#fefefe
| 285368 ||  || — || October 9, 1999 || Kitt Peak || Spacewatch || FLO || align=right data-sort-value="0.65" | 650 m || 
|-id=369 bgcolor=#E9E9E9
| 285369 ||  || — || October 10, 1999 || Kitt Peak || Spacewatch || — || align=right | 1.6 km || 
|-id=370 bgcolor=#d6d6d6
| 285370 ||  || — || October 11, 1999 || Kitt Peak || Spacewatch || — || align=right | 2.5 km || 
|-id=371 bgcolor=#fefefe
| 285371 ||  || — || October 14, 1999 || Kitt Peak || Spacewatch || MAS || align=right data-sort-value="0.93" | 930 m || 
|-id=372 bgcolor=#fefefe
| 285372 ||  || — || October 2, 1999 || Socorro || LINEAR || — || align=right data-sort-value="0.85" | 850 m || 
|-id=373 bgcolor=#E9E9E9
| 285373 ||  || — || October 2, 1999 || Socorro || LINEAR || — || align=right | 1.1 km || 
|-id=374 bgcolor=#fefefe
| 285374 ||  || — || October 2, 1999 || Socorro || LINEAR || V || align=right data-sort-value="0.95" | 950 m || 
|-id=375 bgcolor=#fefefe
| 285375 ||  || — || October 4, 1999 || Socorro || LINEAR || — || align=right | 1.3 km || 
|-id=376 bgcolor=#fefefe
| 285376 ||  || — || October 4, 1999 || Socorro || LINEAR || NYS || align=right data-sort-value="0.84" | 840 m || 
|-id=377 bgcolor=#d6d6d6
| 285377 ||  || — || October 6, 1999 || Socorro || LINEAR || — || align=right | 4.7 km || 
|-id=378 bgcolor=#d6d6d6
| 285378 ||  || — || October 6, 1999 || Socorro || LINEAR || — || align=right | 3.0 km || 
|-id=379 bgcolor=#d6d6d6
| 285379 ||  || — || October 6, 1999 || Socorro || LINEAR || — || align=right | 4.0 km || 
|-id=380 bgcolor=#fefefe
| 285380 ||  || — || October 6, 1999 || Socorro || LINEAR || — || align=right | 1.1 km || 
|-id=381 bgcolor=#fefefe
| 285381 ||  || — || October 7, 1999 || Socorro || LINEAR || NYS || align=right data-sort-value="0.94" | 940 m || 
|-id=382 bgcolor=#d6d6d6
| 285382 ||  || — || October 7, 1999 || Socorro || LINEAR || — || align=right | 3.3 km || 
|-id=383 bgcolor=#fefefe
| 285383 ||  || — || October 9, 1999 || Socorro || LINEAR || NYS || align=right data-sort-value="0.65" | 650 m || 
|-id=384 bgcolor=#d6d6d6
| 285384 ||  || — || October 9, 1999 || Socorro || LINEAR || — || align=right | 4.6 km || 
|-id=385 bgcolor=#fefefe
| 285385 ||  || — || October 10, 1999 || Socorro || LINEAR || FLO || align=right data-sort-value="0.64" | 640 m || 
|-id=386 bgcolor=#E9E9E9
| 285386 ||  || — || October 10, 1999 || Socorro || LINEAR || — || align=right | 3.0 km || 
|-id=387 bgcolor=#d6d6d6
| 285387 ||  || — || October 12, 1999 || Socorro || LINEAR || TIR || align=right | 2.6 km || 
|-id=388 bgcolor=#E9E9E9
| 285388 ||  || — || October 12, 1999 || Socorro || LINEAR || — || align=right | 1.3 km || 
|-id=389 bgcolor=#E9E9E9
| 285389 ||  || — || October 12, 1999 || Socorro || LINEAR || — || align=right | 1.8 km || 
|-id=390 bgcolor=#fefefe
| 285390 ||  || — || October 15, 1999 || Socorro || LINEAR || — || align=right | 1.0 km || 
|-id=391 bgcolor=#d6d6d6
| 285391 ||  || — || October 15, 1999 || Socorro || LINEAR || — || align=right | 3.8 km || 
|-id=392 bgcolor=#E9E9E9
| 285392 ||  || — || October 1, 1999 || Catalina || CSS || — || align=right | 1.3 km || 
|-id=393 bgcolor=#E9E9E9
| 285393 ||  || — || October 12, 1999 || Socorro || LINEAR || — || align=right | 1.5 km || 
|-id=394 bgcolor=#fefefe
| 285394 ||  || — || October 2, 1999 || Kitt Peak || Spacewatch || — || align=right | 1.2 km || 
|-id=395 bgcolor=#E9E9E9
| 285395 ||  || — || October 11, 1999 || Kitt Peak || Spacewatch || — || align=right | 1.6 km || 
|-id=396 bgcolor=#d6d6d6
| 285396 ||  || — || October 15, 1999 || Kitt Peak || Spacewatch || — || align=right | 4.2 km || 
|-id=397 bgcolor=#d6d6d6
| 285397 ||  || — || October 3, 1999 || Socorro || LINEAR || TIR || align=right | 3.9 km || 
|-id=398 bgcolor=#d6d6d6
| 285398 ||  || — || October 6, 1999 || Socorro || LINEAR || — || align=right | 4.4 km || 
|-id=399 bgcolor=#d6d6d6
| 285399 ||  || — || October 10, 1999 || Socorro || LINEAR || — || align=right | 3.8 km || 
|-id=400 bgcolor=#fefefe
| 285400 ||  || — || October 1, 1999 || Kitt Peak || Spacewatch || NYS || align=right data-sort-value="0.72" | 720 m || 
|}

285401–285500 

|-bgcolor=#fefefe
| 285401 ||  || — || October 1, 1999 || Kitt Peak || Spacewatch || — || align=right | 1.2 km || 
|-id=402 bgcolor=#d6d6d6
| 285402 ||  || — || October 6, 1999 || Socorro || LINEAR || HYG || align=right | 3.4 km || 
|-id=403 bgcolor=#E9E9E9
| 285403 ||  || — || October 9, 1999 || Kitt Peak || Spacewatch || — || align=right | 1.1 km || 
|-id=404 bgcolor=#fefefe
| 285404 ||  || — || October 12, 1999 || Kitt Peak || Spacewatch || — || align=right | 1.1 km || 
|-id=405 bgcolor=#d6d6d6
| 285405 ||  || — || October 26, 1999 || Gnosca || S. Sposetti || — || align=right | 4.4 km || 
|-id=406 bgcolor=#E9E9E9
| 285406 ||  || — || October 31, 1999 || Kitt Peak || Spacewatch || — || align=right | 1.1 km || 
|-id=407 bgcolor=#E9E9E9
| 285407 ||  || — || October 31, 1999 || Kitt Peak || Spacewatch || — || align=right | 1.3 km || 
|-id=408 bgcolor=#d6d6d6
| 285408 ||  || — || October 31, 1999 || Kitt Peak || Spacewatch || — || align=right | 3.3 km || 
|-id=409 bgcolor=#E9E9E9
| 285409 ||  || — || October 31, 1999 || Kitt Peak || Spacewatch || — || align=right | 1.4 km || 
|-id=410 bgcolor=#d6d6d6
| 285410 ||  || — || October 31, 1999 || Kitt Peak || Spacewatch || — || align=right | 2.9 km || 
|-id=411 bgcolor=#fefefe
| 285411 ||  || — || November 4, 1999 || Bergisch Gladbach || W. Bickel || — || align=right | 1.0 km || 
|-id=412 bgcolor=#E9E9E9
| 285412 ||  || — || November 1, 1999 || Kitt Peak || Spacewatch || — || align=right | 3.5 km || 
|-id=413 bgcolor=#fefefe
| 285413 ||  || — || November 2, 1999 || Kitt Peak || Spacewatch || NYS || align=right data-sort-value="0.66" | 660 m || 
|-id=414 bgcolor=#E9E9E9
| 285414 ||  || — || November 10, 1999 || Socorro || LINEAR || — || align=right | 1.7 km || 
|-id=415 bgcolor=#fefefe
| 285415 ||  || — || November 4, 1999 || Kitt Peak || Spacewatch || NYS || align=right data-sort-value="0.79" | 790 m || 
|-id=416 bgcolor=#d6d6d6
| 285416 ||  || — || November 4, 1999 || Kitt Peak || Spacewatch || THM || align=right | 2.4 km || 
|-id=417 bgcolor=#fefefe
| 285417 ||  || — || November 3, 1999 || Socorro || LINEAR || — || align=right | 2.9 km || 
|-id=418 bgcolor=#fefefe
| 285418 ||  || — || November 3, 1999 || Socorro || LINEAR || — || align=right data-sort-value="0.81" | 810 m || 
|-id=419 bgcolor=#fefefe
| 285419 ||  || — || November 1, 1999 || Kitt Peak || Spacewatch || — || align=right data-sort-value="0.90" | 900 m || 
|-id=420 bgcolor=#d6d6d6
| 285420 ||  || — || November 5, 1999 || Kitt Peak || Spacewatch || — || align=right | 4.2 km || 
|-id=421 bgcolor=#d6d6d6
| 285421 ||  || — || November 5, 1999 || Kitt Peak || Spacewatch || — || align=right | 2.9 km || 
|-id=422 bgcolor=#fefefe
| 285422 ||  || — || November 9, 1999 || Socorro || LINEAR || V || align=right data-sort-value="0.63" | 630 m || 
|-id=423 bgcolor=#d6d6d6
| 285423 ||  || — || November 9, 1999 || Socorro || LINEAR || — || align=right | 3.7 km || 
|-id=424 bgcolor=#d6d6d6
| 285424 ||  || — || November 9, 1999 || Socorro || LINEAR || — || align=right | 4.0 km || 
|-id=425 bgcolor=#d6d6d6
| 285425 ||  || — || November 9, 1999 || Socorro || LINEAR || — || align=right | 3.6 km || 
|-id=426 bgcolor=#d6d6d6
| 285426 ||  || — || November 9, 1999 || Socorro || LINEAR || — || align=right | 3.1 km || 
|-id=427 bgcolor=#fefefe
| 285427 ||  || — || November 9, 1999 || Socorro || LINEAR || MAS || align=right data-sort-value="0.98" | 980 m || 
|-id=428 bgcolor=#E9E9E9
| 285428 ||  || — || November 9, 1999 || Socorro || LINEAR || — || align=right | 2.2 km || 
|-id=429 bgcolor=#fefefe
| 285429 ||  || — || November 5, 1999 || Kitt Peak || Spacewatch || — || align=right | 1.0 km || 
|-id=430 bgcolor=#fefefe
| 285430 ||  || — || November 5, 1999 || Kitt Peak || Spacewatch || MAS || align=right data-sort-value="0.59" | 590 m || 
|-id=431 bgcolor=#d6d6d6
| 285431 ||  || — || October 29, 1999 || Kitt Peak || Spacewatch || — || align=right | 2.9 km || 
|-id=432 bgcolor=#E9E9E9
| 285432 ||  || — || November 9, 1999 || Kitt Peak || Spacewatch || — || align=right data-sort-value="0.79" | 790 m || 
|-id=433 bgcolor=#E9E9E9
| 285433 ||  || — || November 9, 1999 || Kitt Peak || Spacewatch || — || align=right | 1.9 km || 
|-id=434 bgcolor=#fefefe
| 285434 ||  || — || November 9, 1999 || Kitt Peak || Spacewatch || — || align=right data-sort-value="0.54" | 540 m || 
|-id=435 bgcolor=#fefefe
| 285435 ||  || — || November 10, 1999 || Kitt Peak || Spacewatch || — || align=right | 1.0 km || 
|-id=436 bgcolor=#E9E9E9
| 285436 ||  || — || November 12, 1999 || Socorro || LINEAR || — || align=right | 1.5 km || 
|-id=437 bgcolor=#fefefe
| 285437 ||  || — || November 14, 1999 || Socorro || LINEAR || SUL || align=right | 2.8 km || 
|-id=438 bgcolor=#E9E9E9
| 285438 ||  || — || November 14, 1999 || Socorro || LINEAR || — || align=right | 2.7 km || 
|-id=439 bgcolor=#d6d6d6
| 285439 ||  || — || November 13, 1999 || Kitt Peak || Spacewatch || — || align=right | 3.4 km || 
|-id=440 bgcolor=#E9E9E9
| 285440 ||  || — || November 14, 1999 || Socorro || LINEAR || — || align=right | 1.1 km || 
|-id=441 bgcolor=#fefefe
| 285441 ||  || — || November 12, 1999 || Socorro || LINEAR || — || align=right | 1.6 km || 
|-id=442 bgcolor=#d6d6d6
| 285442 ||  || — || November 15, 1999 || Socorro || LINEAR || NAE || align=right | 3.7 km || 
|-id=443 bgcolor=#fefefe
| 285443 ||  || — || November 15, 1999 || Socorro || LINEAR || — || align=right data-sort-value="0.80" | 800 m || 
|-id=444 bgcolor=#fefefe
| 285444 ||  || — || November 5, 1999 || Kitt Peak || Spacewatch || MAS || align=right data-sort-value="0.82" | 820 m || 
|-id=445 bgcolor=#E9E9E9
| 285445 ||  || — || November 10, 1999 || Kitt Peak || Spacewatch || AEO || align=right | 1.4 km || 
|-id=446 bgcolor=#E9E9E9
| 285446 ||  || — || November 12, 1999 || Socorro || LINEAR || — || align=right | 2.9 km || 
|-id=447 bgcolor=#d6d6d6
| 285447 ||  || — || November 4, 1999 || Kitt Peak || Spacewatch || — || align=right | 4.3 km || 
|-id=448 bgcolor=#E9E9E9
| 285448 ||  || — || November 30, 1999 || Kitt Peak || Spacewatch || — || align=right | 2.4 km || 
|-id=449 bgcolor=#E9E9E9
| 285449 ||  || — || December 2, 1999 || Kitt Peak || Spacewatch || ADE || align=right | 2.5 km || 
|-id=450 bgcolor=#fefefe
| 285450 ||  || — || December 7, 1999 || Socorro || LINEAR || V || align=right data-sort-value="0.85" | 850 m || 
|-id=451 bgcolor=#E9E9E9
| 285451 ||  || — || December 8, 1999 || Catalina || CSS || BAR || align=right | 1.5 km || 
|-id=452 bgcolor=#E9E9E9
| 285452 ||  || — || December 5, 1999 || Anderson Mesa || LONEOS || — || align=right | 2.0 km || 
|-id=453 bgcolor=#E9E9E9
| 285453 ||  || — || December 3, 1999 || Kitt Peak || Spacewatch || — || align=right | 1.8 km || 
|-id=454 bgcolor=#E9E9E9
| 285454 ||  || — || December 13, 1999 || Socorro || LINEAR || — || align=right | 2.3 km || 
|-id=455 bgcolor=#E9E9E9
| 285455 ||  || — || December 13, 1999 || Socorro || LINEAR || — || align=right | 3.2 km || 
|-id=456 bgcolor=#E9E9E9
| 285456 ||  || — || December 7, 1999 || Kitt Peak || Spacewatch || — || align=right | 1.3 km || 
|-id=457 bgcolor=#fefefe
| 285457 ||  || — || December 2, 1999 || Kitt Peak || Spacewatch || V || align=right data-sort-value="0.78" | 780 m || 
|-id=458 bgcolor=#E9E9E9
| 285458 ||  || — || December 5, 1999 || Kitt Peak || Spacewatch || — || align=right data-sort-value="0.87" | 870 m || 
|-id=459 bgcolor=#d6d6d6
| 285459 ||  || — || December 9, 1999 || Kitt Peak || Spacewatch || — || align=right | 3.4 km || 
|-id=460 bgcolor=#E9E9E9
| 285460 ||  || — || December 12, 1999 || Kitt Peak || Spacewatch || — || align=right | 3.0 km || 
|-id=461 bgcolor=#E9E9E9
| 285461 ||  || — || December 7, 1999 || Kitt Peak || Spacewatch || — || align=right | 2.1 km || 
|-id=462 bgcolor=#d6d6d6
| 285462 ||  || — || December 16, 1999 || Kitt Peak || Spacewatch || ALA || align=right | 4.4 km || 
|-id=463 bgcolor=#E9E9E9
| 285463 ||  || — || December 27, 1999 || Kitt Peak || Spacewatch || RAF || align=right | 1.6 km || 
|-id=464 bgcolor=#fefefe
| 285464 ||  || — || December 27, 1999 || Kitt Peak || Spacewatch || NYS || align=right data-sort-value="0.60" | 600 m || 
|-id=465 bgcolor=#E9E9E9
| 285465 ||  || — || December 27, 1999 || Kitt Peak || Spacewatch || — || align=right | 1.3 km || 
|-id=466 bgcolor=#fefefe
| 285466 ||  || — || December 16, 1999 || Kitt Peak || Spacewatch || MAS || align=right data-sort-value="0.73" | 730 m || 
|-id=467 bgcolor=#E9E9E9
| 285467 ||  || — || December 16, 1999 || Kitt Peak || Spacewatch || MIS || align=right | 2.2 km || 
|-id=468 bgcolor=#d6d6d6
| 285468 ||  || — || December 16, 1999 || Kitt Peak || Spacewatch || HYG || align=right | 3.9 km || 
|-id=469 bgcolor=#E9E9E9
| 285469 ||  || — || January 3, 2000 || Socorro || LINEAR || — || align=right | 2.3 km || 
|-id=470 bgcolor=#E9E9E9
| 285470 ||  || — || January 8, 2000 || Socorro || LINEAR || — || align=right | 3.4 km || 
|-id=471 bgcolor=#fefefe
| 285471 ||  || — || January 3, 2000 || Kitt Peak || Spacewatch || — || align=right | 1.2 km || 
|-id=472 bgcolor=#d6d6d6
| 285472 ||  || — || January 4, 2000 || Kitt Peak || Spacewatch || — || align=right | 4.7 km || 
|-id=473 bgcolor=#E9E9E9
| 285473 ||  || — || January 6, 2000 || Kitt Peak || Spacewatch || — || align=right | 2.9 km || 
|-id=474 bgcolor=#d6d6d6
| 285474 ||  || — || January 8, 2000 || Kitt Peak || Spacewatch || THM || align=right | 2.0 km || 
|-id=475 bgcolor=#E9E9E9
| 285475 ||  || — || January 8, 2000 || Kitt Peak || Spacewatch || — || align=right | 2.4 km || 
|-id=476 bgcolor=#E9E9E9
| 285476 ||  || — || January 2, 2000 || Kitt Peak || Spacewatch || — || align=right | 1.3 km || 
|-id=477 bgcolor=#E9E9E9
| 285477 ||  || — || January 26, 2000 || Kitt Peak || Spacewatch || AGN || align=right | 1.5 km || 
|-id=478 bgcolor=#fefefe
| 285478 ||  || — || January 29, 2000 || Kitt Peak || Spacewatch || NYS || align=right data-sort-value="0.62" | 620 m || 
|-id=479 bgcolor=#E9E9E9
| 285479 ||  || — || January 30, 2000 || Kitt Peak || Spacewatch || — || align=right | 1.7 km || 
|-id=480 bgcolor=#d6d6d6
| 285480 ||  || — || January 29, 2000 || Socorro || LINEAR || — || align=right | 4.3 km || 
|-id=481 bgcolor=#E9E9E9
| 285481 ||  || — || January 27, 2000 || Kitt Peak || Spacewatch || — || align=right | 1.3 km || 
|-id=482 bgcolor=#E9E9E9
| 285482 ||  || — || January 27, 2000 || Kitt Peak || Spacewatch || — || align=right | 3.6 km || 
|-id=483 bgcolor=#E9E9E9
| 285483 ||  || — || January 16, 2000 || Kitt Peak || Spacewatch || — || align=right | 1.9 km || 
|-id=484 bgcolor=#d6d6d6
| 285484 ||  || — || February 2, 2000 || Socorro || LINEAR || — || align=right | 3.6 km || 
|-id=485 bgcolor=#E9E9E9
| 285485 ||  || — || February 3, 2000 || Socorro || LINEAR || — || align=right | 1.6 km || 
|-id=486 bgcolor=#fefefe
| 285486 ||  || — || February 7, 2000 || Kitt Peak || Spacewatch || — || align=right data-sort-value="0.73" | 730 m || 
|-id=487 bgcolor=#fefefe
| 285487 ||  || — || January 30, 2000 || Kitt Peak || Spacewatch || NYS || align=right data-sort-value="0.77" | 770 m || 
|-id=488 bgcolor=#E9E9E9
| 285488 ||  || — || February 8, 2000 || Kitt Peak || Spacewatch || — || align=right | 1.1 km || 
|-id=489 bgcolor=#E9E9E9
| 285489 ||  || — || February 8, 2000 || Kitt Peak || Spacewatch || PAD || align=right | 2.1 km || 
|-id=490 bgcolor=#d6d6d6
| 285490 ||  || — || February 10, 2000 || Kitt Peak || Spacewatch || — || align=right | 4.7 km || 
|-id=491 bgcolor=#d6d6d6
| 285491 ||  || — || February 12, 2000 || Kitt Peak || Spacewatch || — || align=right | 4.2 km || 
|-id=492 bgcolor=#E9E9E9
| 285492 ||  || — || February 4, 2000 || Kitt Peak || Spacewatch || HEN || align=right | 1.0 km || 
|-id=493 bgcolor=#E9E9E9
| 285493 ||  || — || February 4, 2000 || Kitt Peak || Spacewatch || — || align=right | 1.5 km || 
|-id=494 bgcolor=#fefefe
| 285494 ||  || — || February 3, 2000 || Kitt Peak || Spacewatch || — || align=right data-sort-value="0.77" | 770 m || 
|-id=495 bgcolor=#d6d6d6
| 285495 ||  || — || February 3, 2000 || Kitt Peak || Spacewatch || — || align=right | 3.6 km || 
|-id=496 bgcolor=#fefefe
| 285496 ||  || — || February 26, 2000 || Kitt Peak || Spacewatch || — || align=right data-sort-value="0.87" | 870 m || 
|-id=497 bgcolor=#E9E9E9
| 285497 ||  || — || February 27, 2000 || Kitt Peak || Spacewatch || AGN || align=right | 1.6 km || 
|-id=498 bgcolor=#fefefe
| 285498 ||  || — || February 29, 2000 || Socorro || LINEAR || — || align=right | 1.2 km || 
|-id=499 bgcolor=#E9E9E9
| 285499 ||  || — || February 29, 2000 || Socorro || LINEAR || — || align=right | 3.2 km || 
|-id=500 bgcolor=#fefefe
| 285500 ||  || — || February 29, 2000 || Socorro || LINEAR || — || align=right | 1.1 km || 
|}

285501–285600 

|-bgcolor=#E9E9E9
| 285501 ||  || — || February 29, 2000 || Socorro || LINEAR || — || align=right | 3.3 km || 
|-id=502 bgcolor=#d6d6d6
| 285502 ||  || — || February 29, 2000 || Socorro || LINEAR || 629 || align=right | 1.9 km || 
|-id=503 bgcolor=#E9E9E9
| 285503 ||  || — || February 29, 2000 || Socorro || LINEAR || — || align=right | 2.2 km || 
|-id=504 bgcolor=#d6d6d6
| 285504 ||  || — || February 29, 2000 || Socorro || LINEAR || HYG || align=right | 3.1 km || 
|-id=505 bgcolor=#E9E9E9
| 285505 ||  || — || February 29, 2000 || Socorro || LINEAR || — || align=right | 2.9 km || 
|-id=506 bgcolor=#E9E9E9
| 285506 ||  || — || March 3, 2000 || Kitt Peak || Spacewatch || — || align=right data-sort-value="0.98" | 980 m || 
|-id=507 bgcolor=#d6d6d6
| 285507 ||  || — || March 4, 2000 || Kitt Peak || Spacewatch || THM || align=right | 2.6 km || 
|-id=508 bgcolor=#fefefe
| 285508 ||  || — || March 5, 2000 || Socorro || LINEAR || — || align=right data-sort-value="0.97" | 970 m || 
|-id=509 bgcolor=#E9E9E9
| 285509 ||  || — || March 5, 2000 || Socorro || LINEAR || — || align=right | 2.8 km || 
|-id=510 bgcolor=#E9E9E9
| 285510 ||  || — || March 3, 2000 || Kitt Peak || Spacewatch || — || align=right | 2.7 km || 
|-id=511 bgcolor=#E9E9E9
| 285511 ||  || — || March 3, 2000 || Kitt Peak || Spacewatch || — || align=right data-sort-value="0.78" | 780 m || 
|-id=512 bgcolor=#fefefe
| 285512 ||  || — || March 10, 2000 || Kitt Peak || Spacewatch || — || align=right data-sort-value="0.94" | 940 m || 
|-id=513 bgcolor=#fefefe
| 285513 ||  || — || March 12, 2000 || Kitt Peak || Spacewatch || — || align=right | 1.7 km || 
|-id=514 bgcolor=#E9E9E9
| 285514 ||  || — || March 9, 2000 || Kitt Peak || Spacewatch || — || align=right | 1.2 km || 
|-id=515 bgcolor=#fefefe
| 285515 ||  || — || March 10, 2000 || Kitt Peak || Spacewatch || NYS || align=right data-sort-value="0.81" | 810 m || 
|-id=516 bgcolor=#d6d6d6
| 285516 ||  || — || March 4, 2000 || Socorro || LINEAR || ITH || align=right | 1.9 km || 
|-id=517 bgcolor=#fefefe
| 285517 ||  || — || March 6, 2000 || Haleakala || NEAT || — || align=right data-sort-value="0.93" | 930 m || 
|-id=518 bgcolor=#E9E9E9
| 285518 ||  || — || March 2, 2000 || Kitt Peak || Spacewatch || — || align=right | 3.2 km || 
|-id=519 bgcolor=#E9E9E9
| 285519 ||  || — || March 3, 2000 || Socorro || LINEAR || — || align=right | 2.5 km || 
|-id=520 bgcolor=#E9E9E9
| 285520 ||  || — || March 27, 2000 || Kitt Peak || Spacewatch || — || align=right | 2.5 km || 
|-id=521 bgcolor=#d6d6d6
| 285521 ||  || — || March 25, 2000 || Kitt Peak || Spacewatch || EOS || align=right | 2.1 km || 
|-id=522 bgcolor=#d6d6d6
| 285522 ||  || — || March 25, 2000 || Kitt Peak || Spacewatch || — || align=right | 3.1 km || 
|-id=523 bgcolor=#E9E9E9
| 285523 ||  || — || March 30, 2000 || Kitt Peak || Spacewatch || — || align=right | 1.7 km || 
|-id=524 bgcolor=#E9E9E9
| 285524 ||  || — || March 29, 2000 || Socorro || LINEAR || POS || align=right | 3.2 km || 
|-id=525 bgcolor=#E9E9E9
| 285525 ||  || — || March 29, 2000 || Socorro || LINEAR || MAR || align=right | 1.5 km || 
|-id=526 bgcolor=#E9E9E9
| 285526 ||  || — || March 29, 2000 || Kitt Peak || Spacewatch || HOF || align=right | 2.7 km || 
|-id=527 bgcolor=#d6d6d6
| 285527 ||  || — || March 29, 2000 || Kitt Peak || Spacewatch || 7:4 || align=right | 2.7 km || 
|-id=528 bgcolor=#E9E9E9
| 285528 ||  || — || March 27, 2000 || Anderson Mesa || LONEOS || — || align=right | 2.4 km || 
|-id=529 bgcolor=#E9E9E9
| 285529 ||  || — || March 25, 2000 || Kitt Peak || Spacewatch || — || align=right | 1.6 km || 
|-id=530 bgcolor=#fefefe
| 285530 ||  || — || April 5, 2000 || Socorro || LINEAR || — || align=right data-sort-value="0.72" | 720 m || 
|-id=531 bgcolor=#fefefe
| 285531 ||  || — || April 5, 2000 || Socorro || LINEAR || FLO || align=right data-sort-value="0.79" | 790 m || 
|-id=532 bgcolor=#fefefe
| 285532 ||  || — || April 5, 2000 || Socorro || LINEAR || V || align=right data-sort-value="0.90" | 900 m || 
|-id=533 bgcolor=#fefefe
| 285533 ||  || — || April 5, 2000 || Socorro || LINEAR || — || align=right data-sort-value="0.83" | 830 m || 
|-id=534 bgcolor=#E9E9E9
| 285534 ||  || — || April 5, 2000 || Socorro || LINEAR || — || align=right | 1.0 km || 
|-id=535 bgcolor=#E9E9E9
| 285535 ||  || — || April 5, 2000 || Socorro || LINEAR || — || align=right | 1.7 km || 
|-id=536 bgcolor=#E9E9E9
| 285536 ||  || — || April 5, 2000 || Socorro || LINEAR || — || align=right | 2.4 km || 
|-id=537 bgcolor=#E9E9E9
| 285537 ||  || — || April 2, 2000 || Anderson Mesa || LONEOS || — || align=right | 4.1 km || 
|-id=538 bgcolor=#E9E9E9
| 285538 ||  || — || April 3, 2000 || Anderson Mesa || LONEOS || — || align=right | 1.7 km || 
|-id=539 bgcolor=#E9E9E9
| 285539 ||  || — || April 5, 2000 || Kitt Peak || Spacewatch || — || align=right data-sort-value="0.73" | 730 m || 
|-id=540 bgcolor=#FFC2E0
| 285540 ||  || — || April 7, 2000 || Anderson Mesa || LONEOS || APOcritical || align=right data-sort-value="0.71" | 710 m || 
|-id=541 bgcolor=#E9E9E9
| 285541 ||  || — || April 11, 2000 || Kitt Peak || Spacewatch || — || align=right | 1.7 km || 
|-id=542 bgcolor=#fefefe
| 285542 ||  || — || April 4, 2000 || Anderson Mesa || LONEOS || FLO || align=right data-sort-value="0.83" | 830 m || 
|-id=543 bgcolor=#d6d6d6
| 285543 ||  || — || April 5, 2000 || Anderson Mesa || LONEOS || BRA || align=right | 2.2 km || 
|-id=544 bgcolor=#E9E9E9
| 285544 ||  || — || April 5, 2000 || Socorro || LINEAR || HEN || align=right | 1.3 km || 
|-id=545 bgcolor=#fefefe
| 285545 ||  || — || April 6, 2000 || Socorro || LINEAR || — || align=right | 1.7 km || 
|-id=546 bgcolor=#fefefe
| 285546 ||  || — || April 29, 2000 || Kitt Peak || Spacewatch || H || align=right data-sort-value="0.96" | 960 m || 
|-id=547 bgcolor=#fefefe
| 285547 ||  || — || April 29, 2000 || Socorro || LINEAR || — || align=right data-sort-value="0.90" | 900 m || 
|-id=548 bgcolor=#fefefe
| 285548 ||  || — || April 26, 2000 || Kitt Peak || Spacewatch || — || align=right data-sort-value="0.87" | 870 m || 
|-id=549 bgcolor=#fefefe
| 285549 ||  || — || May 3, 2000 || Kitt Peak || Spacewatch || — || align=right data-sort-value="0.71" | 710 m || 
|-id=550 bgcolor=#d6d6d6
| 285550 ||  || — || May 4, 2000 || Kitt Peak || Spacewatch || — || align=right | 3.2 km || 
|-id=551 bgcolor=#fefefe
| 285551 ||  || — || May 7, 2000 || Kitt Peak || Spacewatch || FLO || align=right data-sort-value="0.59" | 590 m || 
|-id=552 bgcolor=#d6d6d6
| 285552 ||  || — || May 4, 2000 || Apache Point || SDSS || 615 || align=right | 1.9 km || 
|-id=553 bgcolor=#fefefe
| 285553 ||  || — || May 26, 2000 || Socorro || LINEAR || H || align=right | 1.3 km || 
|-id=554 bgcolor=#E9E9E9
| 285554 ||  || — || May 27, 2000 || Socorro || LINEAR || — || align=right | 2.5 km || 
|-id=555 bgcolor=#E9E9E9
| 285555 ||  || — || May 24, 2000 || Kitt Peak || Spacewatch || — || align=right | 4.1 km || 
|-id=556 bgcolor=#E9E9E9
| 285556 ||  || — || May 30, 2000 || Kitt Peak || Spacewatch || — || align=right | 1.5 km || 
|-id=557 bgcolor=#E9E9E9
| 285557 ||  || — || May 28, 2000 || Kitt Peak || Spacewatch || — || align=right | 2.0 km || 
|-id=558 bgcolor=#fefefe
| 285558 ||  || — || May 30, 2000 || Kitt Peak || Spacewatch || — || align=right data-sort-value="0.91" | 910 m || 
|-id=559 bgcolor=#E9E9E9
| 285559 ||  || — || May 30, 2000 || Kitt Peak || Spacewatch || — || align=right | 2.0 km || 
|-id=560 bgcolor=#E9E9E9
| 285560 ||  || — || May 24, 2000 || Kitt Peak || Spacewatch || — || align=right | 2.8 km || 
|-id=561 bgcolor=#E9E9E9
| 285561 ||  || — || May 26, 2000 || Anderson Mesa || LONEOS || — || align=right | 1.9 km || 
|-id=562 bgcolor=#E9E9E9
| 285562 ||  || — || May 27, 2000 || Socorro || LINEAR || DOR || align=right | 3.3 km || 
|-id=563 bgcolor=#fefefe
| 285563 ||  || — || May 27, 2000 || Anderson Mesa || LONEOS || H || align=right data-sort-value="0.74" | 740 m || 
|-id=564 bgcolor=#E9E9E9
| 285564 ||  || — || May 28, 2000 || Socorro || LINEAR || — || align=right | 3.3 km || 
|-id=565 bgcolor=#fefefe
| 285565 ||  || — || June 1, 2000 || Kitt Peak || Spacewatch || — || align=right data-sort-value="0.91" | 910 m || 
|-id=566 bgcolor=#fefefe
| 285566 ||  || — || July 5, 2000 || Goodricke-Pigott || R. A. Tucker || — || align=right | 1.1 km || 
|-id=567 bgcolor=#FFC2E0
| 285567 ||  || — || July 23, 2000 || Socorro || LINEAR || APO || align=right data-sort-value="0.71" | 710 m || 
|-id=568 bgcolor=#fefefe
| 285568 ||  || — || July 31, 2000 || Socorro || LINEAR || PHO || align=right | 3.9 km || 
|-id=569 bgcolor=#fefefe
| 285569 ||  || — || July 31, 2000 || Socorro || LINEAR || — || align=right | 1.7 km || 
|-id=570 bgcolor=#fefefe
| 285570 ||  || — || July 30, 2000 || Socorro || LINEAR || — || align=right | 2.5 km || 
|-id=571 bgcolor=#FFC2E0
| 285571 ||  || — || August 9, 2000 || Socorro || LINEAR || AMOmoon || align=right data-sort-value="0.67" | 670 m || 
|-id=572 bgcolor=#d6d6d6
| 285572 ||  || — || August 1, 2000 || Socorro || LINEAR || — || align=right | 4.2 km || 
|-id=573 bgcolor=#fefefe
| 285573 ||  || — || August 24, 2000 || Socorro || LINEAR || — || align=right data-sort-value="0.83" | 830 m || 
|-id=574 bgcolor=#FA8072
| 285574 ||  || — || August 24, 2000 || Socorro || LINEAR || — || align=right data-sort-value="0.86" | 860 m || 
|-id=575 bgcolor=#fefefe
| 285575 ||  || — || August 24, 2000 || Socorro || LINEAR || — || align=right | 1.0 km || 
|-id=576 bgcolor=#d6d6d6
| 285576 ||  || — || August 24, 2000 || Socorro || LINEAR || — || align=right | 4.4 km || 
|-id=577 bgcolor=#fefefe
| 285577 ||  || — || August 24, 2000 || Socorro || LINEAR || — || align=right | 1.4 km || 
|-id=578 bgcolor=#fefefe
| 285578 ||  || — || August 24, 2000 || Socorro || LINEAR || NYS || align=right data-sort-value="0.97" | 970 m || 
|-id=579 bgcolor=#fefefe
| 285579 ||  || — || August 24, 2000 || Socorro || LINEAR || NYS || align=right data-sort-value="0.89" | 890 m || 
|-id=580 bgcolor=#d6d6d6
| 285580 ||  || — || August 24, 2000 || Socorro || LINEAR || — || align=right | 3.2 km || 
|-id=581 bgcolor=#d6d6d6
| 285581 ||  || — || August 24, 2000 || Socorro || LINEAR || EMA || align=right | 5.4 km || 
|-id=582 bgcolor=#d6d6d6
| 285582 ||  || — || August 24, 2000 || Socorro || LINEAR || EUP || align=right | 6.4 km || 
|-id=583 bgcolor=#fefefe
| 285583 ||  || — || August 26, 2000 || Socorro || LINEAR || — || align=right data-sort-value="0.95" | 950 m || 
|-id=584 bgcolor=#d6d6d6
| 285584 ||  || — || August 26, 2000 || Prescott || P. G. Comba || HYG || align=right | 3.2 km || 
|-id=585 bgcolor=#fefefe
| 285585 ||  || — || August 29, 2000 || Socorro || LINEAR || — || align=right | 1.5 km || 
|-id=586 bgcolor=#fefefe
| 285586 ||  || — || August 24, 2000 || Socorro || LINEAR || — || align=right | 1.1 km || 
|-id=587 bgcolor=#fefefe
| 285587 ||  || — || August 24, 2000 || Socorro || LINEAR || FLO || align=right data-sort-value="0.66" | 660 m || 
|-id=588 bgcolor=#fefefe
| 285588 ||  || — || August 25, 2000 || Socorro || LINEAR || — || align=right | 1.2 km || 
|-id=589 bgcolor=#fefefe
| 285589 ||  || — || August 26, 2000 || Socorro || LINEAR || — || align=right data-sort-value="0.73" | 730 m || 
|-id=590 bgcolor=#fefefe
| 285590 ||  || — || August 28, 2000 || Socorro || LINEAR || V || align=right | 1.1 km || 
|-id=591 bgcolor=#fefefe
| 285591 ||  || — || August 28, 2000 || Socorro || LINEAR || — || align=right | 1.3 km || 
|-id=592 bgcolor=#fefefe
| 285592 ||  || — || August 24, 2000 || Socorro || LINEAR || NYS || align=right data-sort-value="0.78" | 780 m || 
|-id=593 bgcolor=#E9E9E9
| 285593 ||  || — || August 24, 2000 || Socorro || LINEAR || — || align=right | 1.2 km || 
|-id=594 bgcolor=#FA8072
| 285594 ||  || — || August 24, 2000 || Socorro || LINEAR || — || align=right | 2.1 km || 
|-id=595 bgcolor=#fefefe
| 285595 ||  || — || August 29, 2000 || Socorro || LINEAR || MAS || align=right data-sort-value="0.90" | 900 m || 
|-id=596 bgcolor=#E9E9E9
| 285596 ||  || — || August 24, 2000 || Socorro || LINEAR || — || align=right | 2.9 km || 
|-id=597 bgcolor=#fefefe
| 285597 ||  || — || August 29, 2000 || Socorro || LINEAR || ERI || align=right | 1.8 km || 
|-id=598 bgcolor=#fefefe
| 285598 ||  || — || August 31, 2000 || Socorro || LINEAR || FLO || align=right data-sort-value="0.74" | 740 m || 
|-id=599 bgcolor=#fefefe
| 285599 ||  || — || August 31, 2000 || Socorro || LINEAR || — || align=right | 1.3 km || 
|-id=600 bgcolor=#fefefe
| 285600 ||  || — || August 31, 2000 || Socorro || LINEAR || — || align=right | 2.3 km || 
|}

285601–285700 

|-bgcolor=#E9E9E9
| 285601 ||  || — || August 31, 2000 || Socorro || LINEAR || — || align=right | 2.6 km || 
|-id=602 bgcolor=#FA8072
| 285602 ||  || — || August 31, 2000 || Socorro || LINEAR || — || align=right | 1.3 km || 
|-id=603 bgcolor=#d6d6d6
| 285603 ||  || — || August 31, 2000 || Socorro || LINEAR || — || align=right | 4.1 km || 
|-id=604 bgcolor=#fefefe
| 285604 ||  || — || August 31, 2000 || Socorro || LINEAR || FLO || align=right data-sort-value="0.82" | 820 m || 
|-id=605 bgcolor=#d6d6d6
| 285605 ||  || — || August 31, 2000 || Socorro || LINEAR || — || align=right | 3.9 km || 
|-id=606 bgcolor=#d6d6d6
| 285606 ||  || — || August 31, 2000 || Socorro || LINEAR || IMH || align=right | 3.8 km || 
|-id=607 bgcolor=#fefefe
| 285607 ||  || — || August 26, 2000 || Socorro || LINEAR || — || align=right | 1.1 km || 
|-id=608 bgcolor=#fefefe
| 285608 ||  || — || August 31, 2000 || Socorro || LINEAR || ERI || align=right | 2.4 km || 
|-id=609 bgcolor=#d6d6d6
| 285609 ||  || — || August 31, 2000 || Socorro || LINEAR || — || align=right | 4.4 km || 
|-id=610 bgcolor=#fefefe
| 285610 ||  || — || August 31, 2000 || Socorro || LINEAR || V || align=right data-sort-value="0.95" | 950 m || 
|-id=611 bgcolor=#fefefe
| 285611 ||  || — || August 31, 2000 || Socorro || LINEAR || — || align=right | 2.2 km || 
|-id=612 bgcolor=#fefefe
| 285612 ||  || — || August 31, 2000 || Socorro || LINEAR || MAS || align=right | 1.1 km || 
|-id=613 bgcolor=#fefefe
| 285613 ||  || — || August 31, 2000 || Socorro || LINEAR || — || align=right | 1.3 km || 
|-id=614 bgcolor=#d6d6d6
| 285614 ||  || — || August 31, 2000 || Kvistaberg || UDAS || — || align=right | 3.9 km || 
|-id=615 bgcolor=#E9E9E9
| 285615 ||  || — || August 25, 2000 || Cerro Tololo || M. W. Buie || — || align=right | 1.7 km || 
|-id=616 bgcolor=#fefefe
| 285616 ||  || — || August 27, 2000 || Cerro Tololo || M. W. Buie || FLO || align=right data-sort-value="0.58" | 580 m || 
|-id=617 bgcolor=#E9E9E9
| 285617 ||  || — || September 1, 2000 || Bologna || San Vittore Obs. || BAR || align=right | 1.7 km || 
|-id=618 bgcolor=#FA8072
| 285618 ||  || — || September 1, 2000 || Socorro || LINEAR || — || align=right | 1.2 km || 
|-id=619 bgcolor=#d6d6d6
| 285619 ||  || — || September 1, 2000 || Socorro || LINEAR || — || align=right | 3.9 km || 
|-id=620 bgcolor=#fefefe
| 285620 ||  || — || September 1, 2000 || Socorro || LINEAR || — || align=right data-sort-value="0.99" | 990 m || 
|-id=621 bgcolor=#d6d6d6
| 285621 ||  || — || September 1, 2000 || Socorro || LINEAR || — || align=right | 4.8 km || 
|-id=622 bgcolor=#fefefe
| 285622 ||  || — || September 1, 2000 || Socorro || LINEAR || ERI || align=right | 1.8 km || 
|-id=623 bgcolor=#fefefe
| 285623 ||  || — || September 1, 2000 || Socorro || LINEAR || — || align=right data-sort-value="0.95" | 950 m || 
|-id=624 bgcolor=#fefefe
| 285624 ||  || — || September 1, 2000 || Socorro || LINEAR || — || align=right | 1.1 km || 
|-id=625 bgcolor=#FFC2E0
| 285625 ||  || — || September 1, 2000 || Socorro || LINEAR || AMO +1kmfast?critical || align=right | 1.0 km || 
|-id=626 bgcolor=#fefefe
| 285626 ||  || — || September 3, 2000 || Socorro || LINEAR || H || align=right data-sort-value="0.80" | 800 m || 
|-id=627 bgcolor=#d6d6d6
| 285627 ||  || — || September 1, 2000 || Socorro || LINEAR || — || align=right | 4.6 km || 
|-id=628 bgcolor=#E9E9E9
| 285628 ||  || — || September 2, 2000 || Socorro || LINEAR || IAN || align=right | 1.3 km || 
|-id=629 bgcolor=#E9E9E9
| 285629 ||  || — || September 3, 2000 || Socorro || LINEAR || — || align=right | 3.9 km || 
|-id=630 bgcolor=#E9E9E9
| 285630 ||  || — || September 1, 2000 || Socorro || LINEAR || — || align=right | 2.2 km || 
|-id=631 bgcolor=#FA8072
| 285631 ||  || — || September 2, 2000 || Anderson Mesa || LONEOS || — || align=right | 1.3 km || 
|-id=632 bgcolor=#d6d6d6
| 285632 ||  || — || September 2, 2000 || Anderson Mesa || LONEOS || — || align=right | 4.7 km || 
|-id=633 bgcolor=#d6d6d6
| 285633 ||  || — || September 3, 2000 || Socorro || LINEAR || EUP || align=right | 4.7 km || 
|-id=634 bgcolor=#fefefe
| 285634 ||  || — || September 3, 2000 || Socorro || LINEAR || V || align=right data-sort-value="0.94" | 940 m || 
|-id=635 bgcolor=#d6d6d6
| 285635 ||  || — || September 3, 2000 || Socorro || LINEAR || TIR || align=right | 4.5 km || 
|-id=636 bgcolor=#fefefe
| 285636 || 2000 SA || — || September 17, 2000 || Olathe || L. Robinson || NYS || align=right | 1.0 km || 
|-id=637 bgcolor=#fefefe
| 285637 ||  || — || September 20, 2000 || Socorro || LINEAR || H || align=right data-sort-value="0.79" | 790 m || 
|-id=638 bgcolor=#FFC2E0
| 285638 ||  || — || September 23, 2000 || Socorro || LINEAR || APO +1km || align=right | 1.1 km || 
|-id=639 bgcolor=#fefefe
| 285639 ||  || — || September 24, 2000 || Prescott || P. G. Comba || FLO || align=right data-sort-value="0.94" | 940 m || 
|-id=640 bgcolor=#d6d6d6
| 285640 ||  || — || September 23, 2000 || Socorro || LINEAR || — || align=right | 3.9 km || 
|-id=641 bgcolor=#fefefe
| 285641 ||  || — || September 2, 2000 || Anderson Mesa || LONEOS || — || align=right data-sort-value="0.95" | 950 m || 
|-id=642 bgcolor=#fefefe
| 285642 ||  || — || September 23, 2000 || Socorro || LINEAR || — || align=right data-sort-value="0.99" | 990 m || 
|-id=643 bgcolor=#d6d6d6
| 285643 ||  || — || September 23, 2000 || Socorro || LINEAR || — || align=right | 4.0 km || 
|-id=644 bgcolor=#E9E9E9
| 285644 ||  || — || September 23, 2000 || Socorro || LINEAR || — || align=right | 2.6 km || 
|-id=645 bgcolor=#fefefe
| 285645 ||  || — || September 23, 2000 || Socorro || LINEAR || — || align=right data-sort-value="0.93" | 930 m || 
|-id=646 bgcolor=#fefefe
| 285646 ||  || — || September 26, 2000 || Socorro || LINEAR || H || align=right | 1.1 km || 
|-id=647 bgcolor=#fefefe
| 285647 ||  || — || September 23, 2000 || Socorro || LINEAR || — || align=right data-sort-value="0.78" | 780 m || 
|-id=648 bgcolor=#C2FFFF
| 285648 ||  || — || September 23, 2000 || Socorro || LINEAR || L5 || align=right | 14 km || 
|-id=649 bgcolor=#E9E9E9
| 285649 ||  || — || September 24, 2000 || Socorro || LINEAR || — || align=right | 3.4 km || 
|-id=650 bgcolor=#fefefe
| 285650 ||  || — || September 24, 2000 || Socorro || LINEAR || ERI || align=right | 2.4 km || 
|-id=651 bgcolor=#d6d6d6
| 285651 ||  || — || September 24, 2000 || Socorro || LINEAR || — || align=right | 4.7 km || 
|-id=652 bgcolor=#fefefe
| 285652 ||  || — || September 24, 2000 || Socorro || LINEAR || V || align=right data-sort-value="0.92" | 920 m || 
|-id=653 bgcolor=#fefefe
| 285653 ||  || — || September 24, 2000 || Socorro || LINEAR || NYS || align=right | 1.0 km || 
|-id=654 bgcolor=#fefefe
| 285654 ||  || — || September 22, 2000 || Socorro || LINEAR || H || align=right data-sort-value="0.90" | 900 m || 
|-id=655 bgcolor=#fefefe
| 285655 ||  || — || September 26, 2000 || Socorro || LINEAR || H || align=right | 1.0 km || 
|-id=656 bgcolor=#E9E9E9
| 285656 ||  || — || September 23, 2000 || Socorro || LINEAR || JUN || align=right | 1.1 km || 
|-id=657 bgcolor=#d6d6d6
| 285657 ||  || — || September 23, 2000 || Socorro || LINEAR || TIR || align=right | 4.4 km || 
|-id=658 bgcolor=#C2FFFF
| 285658 ||  || — || September 23, 2000 || Socorro || LINEAR || L5 || align=right | 14 km || 
|-id=659 bgcolor=#fefefe
| 285659 ||  || — || September 24, 2000 || Socorro || LINEAR || NYS || align=right data-sort-value="0.87" | 870 m || 
|-id=660 bgcolor=#fefefe
| 285660 ||  || — || September 24, 2000 || Socorro || LINEAR || — || align=right data-sort-value="0.70" | 700 m || 
|-id=661 bgcolor=#fefefe
| 285661 ||  || — || September 24, 2000 || Socorro || LINEAR || V || align=right data-sort-value="0.95" | 950 m || 
|-id=662 bgcolor=#d6d6d6
| 285662 ||  || — || September 24, 2000 || Socorro || LINEAR || MEL || align=right | 6.1 km || 
|-id=663 bgcolor=#fefefe
| 285663 ||  || — || September 24, 2000 || Socorro || LINEAR || NYS || align=right data-sort-value="0.88" | 880 m || 
|-id=664 bgcolor=#fefefe
| 285664 ||  || — || September 24, 2000 || Socorro || LINEAR || FLO || align=right data-sort-value="0.81" | 810 m || 
|-id=665 bgcolor=#fefefe
| 285665 ||  || — || September 24, 2000 || Socorro || LINEAR || NYS || align=right data-sort-value="0.66" | 660 m || 
|-id=666 bgcolor=#d6d6d6
| 285666 ||  || — || September 23, 2000 || Socorro || LINEAR || — || align=right | 4.3 km || 
|-id=667 bgcolor=#fefefe
| 285667 ||  || — || September 23, 2000 || Socorro || LINEAR || ERI || align=right | 2.4 km || 
|-id=668 bgcolor=#fefefe
| 285668 ||  || — || September 24, 2000 || Socorro || LINEAR || NYS || align=right data-sort-value="0.86" | 860 m || 
|-id=669 bgcolor=#fefefe
| 285669 ||  || — || September 24, 2000 || Socorro || LINEAR || — || align=right data-sort-value="0.98" | 980 m || 
|-id=670 bgcolor=#fefefe
| 285670 ||  || — || September 24, 2000 || Socorro || LINEAR || — || align=right | 1.2 km || 
|-id=671 bgcolor=#E9E9E9
| 285671 ||  || — || September 24, 2000 || Socorro || LINEAR || — || align=right | 3.8 km || 
|-id=672 bgcolor=#E9E9E9
| 285672 ||  || — || September 24, 2000 || Socorro || LINEAR || EUN || align=right | 1.5 km || 
|-id=673 bgcolor=#d6d6d6
| 285673 ||  || — || September 22, 2000 || Socorro || LINEAR || EUP || align=right | 4.5 km || 
|-id=674 bgcolor=#fefefe
| 285674 ||  || — || September 23, 2000 || Socorro || LINEAR || — || align=right | 1.0 km || 
|-id=675 bgcolor=#d6d6d6
| 285675 ||  || — || September 23, 2000 || Socorro || LINEAR || — || align=right | 5.1 km || 
|-id=676 bgcolor=#fefefe
| 285676 ||  || — || September 23, 2000 || Socorro || LINEAR || V || align=right data-sort-value="0.84" | 840 m || 
|-id=677 bgcolor=#fefefe
| 285677 ||  || — || September 23, 2000 || Socorro || LINEAR || FLO || align=right data-sort-value="0.67" | 670 m || 
|-id=678 bgcolor=#fefefe
| 285678 ||  || — || September 23, 2000 || Socorro || LINEAR || — || align=right | 1.3 km || 
|-id=679 bgcolor=#fefefe
| 285679 ||  || — || September 23, 2000 || Socorro || LINEAR || — || align=right | 2.6 km || 
|-id=680 bgcolor=#d6d6d6
| 285680 ||  || — || September 24, 2000 || Socorro || LINEAR || EOS || align=right | 2.8 km || 
|-id=681 bgcolor=#d6d6d6
| 285681 ||  || — || September 24, 2000 || Socorro || LINEAR || — || align=right | 3.7 km || 
|-id=682 bgcolor=#fefefe
| 285682 ||  || — || September 24, 2000 || Socorro || LINEAR || — || align=right data-sort-value="0.89" | 890 m || 
|-id=683 bgcolor=#d6d6d6
| 285683 ||  || — || September 24, 2000 || Socorro || LINEAR || THB || align=right | 3.4 km || 
|-id=684 bgcolor=#fefefe
| 285684 ||  || — || September 24, 2000 || Socorro || LINEAR || — || align=right | 1.2 km || 
|-id=685 bgcolor=#d6d6d6
| 285685 ||  || — || September 25, 2000 || Socorro || LINEAR || — || align=right | 4.5 km || 
|-id=686 bgcolor=#fefefe
| 285686 ||  || — || September 30, 2000 || Elmira || A. J. Cecce || — || align=right | 1.1 km || 
|-id=687 bgcolor=#E9E9E9
| 285687 ||  || — || September 30, 2000 || Ondřejov || P. Kušnirák, P. Pravec || — || align=right data-sort-value="0.93" | 930 m || 
|-id=688 bgcolor=#fefefe
| 285688 ||  || — || September 24, 2000 || Socorro || LINEAR || H || align=right data-sort-value="0.98" | 980 m || 
|-id=689 bgcolor=#fefefe
| 285689 ||  || — || September 26, 2000 || Socorro || LINEAR || — || align=right | 3.2 km || 
|-id=690 bgcolor=#fefefe
| 285690 ||  || — || September 20, 2000 || Haleakala || NEAT || — || align=right | 2.8 km || 
|-id=691 bgcolor=#fefefe
| 285691 ||  || — || September 21, 2000 || Kitt Peak || Spacewatch || MAS || align=right data-sort-value="0.80" | 800 m || 
|-id=692 bgcolor=#fefefe
| 285692 ||  || — || September 21, 2000 || Haleakala || NEAT || — || align=right data-sort-value="0.98" | 980 m || 
|-id=693 bgcolor=#d6d6d6
| 285693 ||  || — || September 24, 2000 || Socorro || LINEAR || — || align=right | 3.7 km || 
|-id=694 bgcolor=#E9E9E9
| 285694 ||  || — || September 24, 2000 || Socorro || LINEAR || — || align=right | 1.7 km || 
|-id=695 bgcolor=#fefefe
| 285695 ||  || — || September 24, 2000 || Socorro || LINEAR || — || align=right | 1.0 km || 
|-id=696 bgcolor=#fefefe
| 285696 ||  || — || September 24, 2000 || Socorro || LINEAR || — || align=right data-sort-value="0.81" | 810 m || 
|-id=697 bgcolor=#fefefe
| 285697 ||  || — || September 24, 2000 || Socorro || LINEAR || NYS || align=right data-sort-value="0.87" | 870 m || 
|-id=698 bgcolor=#d6d6d6
| 285698 ||  || — || September 24, 2000 || Socorro || LINEAR || — || align=right | 4.2 km || 
|-id=699 bgcolor=#d6d6d6
| 285699 ||  || — || September 24, 2000 || Socorro || LINEAR || THM || align=right | 2.9 km || 
|-id=700 bgcolor=#E9E9E9
| 285700 ||  || — || September 24, 2000 || Socorro || LINEAR || AGN || align=right | 1.6 km || 
|}

285701–285800 

|-bgcolor=#fefefe
| 285701 ||  || — || September 24, 2000 || Socorro || LINEAR || NYS || align=right data-sort-value="0.85" | 850 m || 
|-id=702 bgcolor=#fefefe
| 285702 ||  || — || September 26, 2000 || Socorro || LINEAR || V || align=right | 1.1 km || 
|-id=703 bgcolor=#fefefe
| 285703 ||  || — || September 27, 2000 || Socorro || LINEAR || — || align=right | 1.0 km || 
|-id=704 bgcolor=#E9E9E9
| 285704 ||  || — || September 21, 2000 || Socorro || LINEAR || DOR || align=right | 3.4 km || 
|-id=705 bgcolor=#fefefe
| 285705 ||  || — || September 25, 2000 || Socorro || LINEAR || ERI || align=right | 2.4 km || 
|-id=706 bgcolor=#d6d6d6
| 285706 ||  || — || September 26, 2000 || Socorro || LINEAR || — || align=right | 3.5 km || 
|-id=707 bgcolor=#E9E9E9
| 285707 ||  || — || September 25, 2000 || Socorro || LINEAR || BAR || align=right | 2.7 km || 
|-id=708 bgcolor=#fefefe
| 285708 ||  || — || September 24, 2000 || Socorro || LINEAR || — || align=right data-sort-value="0.98" | 980 m || 
|-id=709 bgcolor=#fefefe
| 285709 ||  || — || September 24, 2000 || Socorro || LINEAR || NYS || align=right data-sort-value="0.96" | 960 m || 
|-id=710 bgcolor=#fefefe
| 285710 ||  || — || September 24, 2000 || Socorro || LINEAR || V || align=right data-sort-value="0.99" | 990 m || 
|-id=711 bgcolor=#fefefe
| 285711 ||  || — || September 24, 2000 || Socorro || LINEAR || V || align=right | 1.2 km || 
|-id=712 bgcolor=#d6d6d6
| 285712 ||  || — || September 24, 2000 || Socorro || LINEAR || — || align=right | 5.5 km || 
|-id=713 bgcolor=#E9E9E9
| 285713 ||  || — || September 24, 2000 || Socorro || LINEAR || — || align=right | 3.7 km || 
|-id=714 bgcolor=#fefefe
| 285714 ||  || — || September 24, 2000 || Socorro || LINEAR || NYS || align=right data-sort-value="0.84" | 840 m || 
|-id=715 bgcolor=#fefefe
| 285715 ||  || — || September 24, 2000 || Socorro || LINEAR || MAS || align=right | 1.2 km || 
|-id=716 bgcolor=#fefefe
| 285716 ||  || — || September 27, 2000 || Socorro || LINEAR || — || align=right | 1.3 km || 
|-id=717 bgcolor=#d6d6d6
| 285717 ||  || — || September 23, 2000 || Socorro || LINEAR || THB || align=right | 3.2 km || 
|-id=718 bgcolor=#fefefe
| 285718 ||  || — || September 27, 2000 || Socorro || LINEAR || — || align=right | 1.2 km || 
|-id=719 bgcolor=#fefefe
| 285719 ||  || — || September 27, 2000 || Socorro || LINEAR || — || align=right | 1.00 km || 
|-id=720 bgcolor=#d6d6d6
| 285720 ||  || — || September 30, 2000 || Socorro || LINEAR || — || align=right | 4.8 km || 
|-id=721 bgcolor=#E9E9E9
| 285721 ||  || — || September 30, 2000 || Socorro || LINEAR || ADE || align=right | 3.7 km || 
|-id=722 bgcolor=#d6d6d6
| 285722 ||  || — || September 30, 2000 || Socorro || LINEAR || — || align=right | 4.4 km || 
|-id=723 bgcolor=#d6d6d6
| 285723 ||  || — || September 24, 2000 || Socorro || LINEAR || EUP || align=right | 5.2 km || 
|-id=724 bgcolor=#d6d6d6
| 285724 ||  || — || September 28, 2000 || Socorro || LINEAR || — || align=right | 5.1 km || 
|-id=725 bgcolor=#E9E9E9
| 285725 ||  || — || September 30, 2000 || Socorro || LINEAR || — || align=right | 3.5 km || 
|-id=726 bgcolor=#d6d6d6
| 285726 ||  || — || September 30, 2000 || Socorro || LINEAR || — || align=right | 6.6 km || 
|-id=727 bgcolor=#fefefe
| 285727 ||  || — || September 28, 2000 || Kitt Peak || Spacewatch || V || align=right data-sort-value="0.84" | 840 m || 
|-id=728 bgcolor=#fefefe
| 285728 ||  || — || September 29, 2000 || Kitt Peak || Spacewatch || NYS || align=right data-sort-value="0.79" | 790 m || 
|-id=729 bgcolor=#d6d6d6
| 285729 ||  || — || September 22, 2000 || Haute Provence || W. Thuillot || EOS || align=right | 3.3 km || 
|-id=730 bgcolor=#fefefe
| 285730 ||  || — || September 26, 2000 || Haleakala || NEAT || — || align=right | 1.3 km || 
|-id=731 bgcolor=#E9E9E9
| 285731 ||  || — || September 25, 2000 || Haleakala || NEAT || — || align=right | 2.6 km || 
|-id=732 bgcolor=#FA8072
| 285732 ||  || — || September 19, 2000 || Kitt Peak || M. W. Buie || — || align=right data-sort-value="0.80" | 800 m || 
|-id=733 bgcolor=#fefefe
| 285733 ||  || — || September 23, 2000 || Anderson Mesa || LONEOS || — || align=right data-sort-value="0.95" | 950 m || 
|-id=734 bgcolor=#d6d6d6
| 285734 ||  || — || September 22, 2000 || Anderson Mesa || LONEOS || — || align=right | 4.5 km || 
|-id=735 bgcolor=#d6d6d6
| 285735 ||  || — || September 26, 2000 || Apache Point || SDSS || EOS || align=right | 2.2 km || 
|-id=736 bgcolor=#d6d6d6
| 285736 ||  || — || October 1, 2000 || Socorro || LINEAR || — || align=right | 3.5 km || 
|-id=737 bgcolor=#d6d6d6
| 285737 ||  || — || October 1, 2000 || Socorro || LINEAR || — || align=right | 2.4 km || 
|-id=738 bgcolor=#d6d6d6
| 285738 ||  || — || October 1, 2000 || Socorro || LINEAR || — || align=right | 3.1 km || 
|-id=739 bgcolor=#fefefe
| 285739 ||  || — || October 1, 2000 || Socorro || LINEAR || FLO || align=right data-sort-value="0.79" | 790 m || 
|-id=740 bgcolor=#fefefe
| 285740 ||  || — || October 1, 2000 || Socorro || LINEAR || NYS || align=right data-sort-value="0.83" | 830 m || 
|-id=741 bgcolor=#d6d6d6
| 285741 ||  || — || October 1, 2000 || Socorro || LINEAR || — || align=right | 6.4 km || 
|-id=742 bgcolor=#d6d6d6
| 285742 ||  || — || October 1, 2000 || Socorro || LINEAR || — || align=right | 3.9 km || 
|-id=743 bgcolor=#E9E9E9
| 285743 ||  || — || October 1, 2000 || Socorro || LINEAR || EUN || align=right | 1.4 km || 
|-id=744 bgcolor=#fefefe
| 285744 ||  || — || October 4, 2000 || Kitt Peak || Spacewatch || NYS || align=right data-sort-value="0.84" | 840 m || 
|-id=745 bgcolor=#fefefe
| 285745 ||  || — || October 5, 2000 || Kitt Peak || Spacewatch || — || align=right | 1.1 km || 
|-id=746 bgcolor=#d6d6d6
| 285746 ||  || — || October 1, 2000 || Socorro || LINEAR || — || align=right | 3.8 km || 
|-id=747 bgcolor=#fefefe
| 285747 ||  || — || October 1, 2000 || Socorro || LINEAR || — || align=right | 1.2 km || 
|-id=748 bgcolor=#d6d6d6
| 285748 ||  || — || October 1, 2000 || Anderson Mesa || LONEOS || — || align=right | 2.9 km || 
|-id=749 bgcolor=#d6d6d6
| 285749 ||  || — || October 1, 2000 || Socorro || LINEAR || MEL || align=right | 4.8 km || 
|-id=750 bgcolor=#E9E9E9
| 285750 ||  || — || October 1, 2000 || Socorro || LINEAR || INO || align=right | 1.9 km || 
|-id=751 bgcolor=#E9E9E9
| 285751 ||  || — || October 1, 2000 || Kitt Peak || Spacewatch || MAR || align=right | 1.6 km || 
|-id=752 bgcolor=#fefefe
| 285752 ||  || — || October 2, 2000 || Socorro || LINEAR || — || align=right | 1.3 km || 
|-id=753 bgcolor=#d6d6d6
| 285753 ||  || — || October 22, 2000 || Ondřejov || L. Kotková || — || align=right | 4.5 km || 
|-id=754 bgcolor=#fefefe
| 285754 ||  || — || October 24, 2000 || Socorro || LINEAR || — || align=right | 1.2 km || 
|-id=755 bgcolor=#d6d6d6
| 285755 ||  || — || October 24, 2000 || Socorro || LINEAR || — || align=right | 4.3 km || 
|-id=756 bgcolor=#E9E9E9
| 285756 ||  || — || October 25, 2000 || Socorro || LINEAR || BRU || align=right | 3.5 km || 
|-id=757 bgcolor=#fefefe
| 285757 ||  || — || October 24, 2000 || Socorro || LINEAR || — || align=right | 1.4 km || 
|-id=758 bgcolor=#E9E9E9
| 285758 ||  || — || October 25, 2000 || Socorro || LINEAR || — || align=right | 3.4 km || 
|-id=759 bgcolor=#fefefe
| 285759 ||  || — || October 24, 2000 || Socorro || LINEAR || — || align=right | 1.3 km || 
|-id=760 bgcolor=#E9E9E9
| 285760 ||  || — || October 24, 2000 || Socorro || LINEAR || — || align=right | 2.6 km || 
|-id=761 bgcolor=#fefefe
| 285761 ||  || — || October 24, 2000 || Socorro || LINEAR || — || align=right | 1.2 km || 
|-id=762 bgcolor=#d6d6d6
| 285762 ||  || — || October 25, 2000 || Socorro || LINEAR || TIR || align=right | 3.8 km || 
|-id=763 bgcolor=#fefefe
| 285763 ||  || — || October 29, 2000 || Kitt Peak || Spacewatch || NYS || align=right data-sort-value="0.76" | 760 m || 
|-id=764 bgcolor=#E9E9E9
| 285764 ||  || — || October 29, 2000 || Kitt Peak || Spacewatch || HOF || align=right | 3.1 km || 
|-id=765 bgcolor=#d6d6d6
| 285765 ||  || — || October 24, 2000 || Socorro || LINEAR || THB || align=right | 4.8 km || 
|-id=766 bgcolor=#E9E9E9
| 285766 ||  || — || October 24, 2000 || Socorro || LINEAR || — || align=right | 3.0 km || 
|-id=767 bgcolor=#fefefe
| 285767 ||  || — || October 24, 2000 || Socorro || LINEAR || NYS || align=right data-sort-value="0.77" | 770 m || 
|-id=768 bgcolor=#fefefe
| 285768 ||  || — || October 25, 2000 || Socorro || LINEAR || V || align=right data-sort-value="0.95" | 950 m || 
|-id=769 bgcolor=#fefefe
| 285769 ||  || — || October 25, 2000 || Socorro || LINEAR || — || align=right | 1.1 km || 
|-id=770 bgcolor=#d6d6d6
| 285770 ||  || — || October 25, 2000 || Socorro || LINEAR || — || align=right | 4.0 km || 
|-id=771 bgcolor=#d6d6d6
| 285771 ||  || — || October 29, 2000 || Socorro || LINEAR || TIR || align=right | 4.0 km || 
|-id=772 bgcolor=#d6d6d6
| 285772 ||  || — || October 25, 2000 || Socorro || LINEAR || — || align=right | 4.8 km || 
|-id=773 bgcolor=#fefefe
| 285773 ||  || — || October 30, 2000 || Socorro || LINEAR || NYS || align=right data-sort-value="0.86" | 860 m || 
|-id=774 bgcolor=#E9E9E9
| 285774 ||  || — || October 31, 2000 || Socorro || LINEAR || GEF || align=right | 1.8 km || 
|-id=775 bgcolor=#d6d6d6
| 285775 ||  || — || October 31, 2000 || Socorro || LINEAR || VER || align=right | 3.8 km || 
|-id=776 bgcolor=#fefefe
| 285776 ||  || — || October 25, 2000 || Socorro || LINEAR || — || align=right | 1.2 km || 
|-id=777 bgcolor=#fefefe
| 285777 ||  || — || October 25, 2000 || Socorro || LINEAR || — || align=right | 1.2 km || 
|-id=778 bgcolor=#d6d6d6
| 285778 ||  || — || October 29, 2000 || Socorro || LINEAR || — || align=right | 4.5 km || 
|-id=779 bgcolor=#E9E9E9
| 285779 ||  || — || November 3, 2000 || Socorro || LINEAR || JUN || align=right | 3.8 km || 
|-id=780 bgcolor=#d6d6d6
| 285780 ||  || — || November 2, 2000 || Socorro || LINEAR || THM || align=right | 3.5 km || 
|-id=781 bgcolor=#d6d6d6
| 285781 ||  || — || November 22, 2000 || Eskridge || G. Hug || TIR || align=right | 3.7 km || 
|-id=782 bgcolor=#d6d6d6
| 285782 ||  || — || November 20, 2000 || Kitt Peak || Spacewatch || — || align=right | 4.6 km || 
|-id=783 bgcolor=#fefefe
| 285783 ||  || — || November 22, 2000 || Haleakala || NEAT || — || align=right | 1.6 km || 
|-id=784 bgcolor=#fefefe
| 285784 ||  || — || November 25, 2000 || Junk Bond || J. Medkeff || — || align=right | 1.0 km || 
|-id=785 bgcolor=#d6d6d6
| 285785 ||  || — || November 21, 2000 || Socorro || LINEAR || 3:2 || align=right | 5.5 km || 
|-id=786 bgcolor=#FA8072
| 285786 ||  || — || November 27, 2000 || Kitt Peak || Spacewatch || — || align=right data-sort-value="0.75" | 750 m || 
|-id=787 bgcolor=#fefefe
| 285787 ||  || — || November 19, 2000 || Socorro || LINEAR || V || align=right data-sort-value="0.89" | 890 m || 
|-id=788 bgcolor=#d6d6d6
| 285788 ||  || — || November 20, 2000 || Socorro || LINEAR || — || align=right | 3.5 km || 
|-id=789 bgcolor=#fefefe
| 285789 ||  || — || November 21, 2000 || Socorro || LINEAR || V || align=right | 1.0 km || 
|-id=790 bgcolor=#d6d6d6
| 285790 ||  || — || November 25, 2000 || Socorro || LINEAR || — || align=right | 5.7 km || 
|-id=791 bgcolor=#d6d6d6
| 285791 ||  || — || November 19, 2000 || Socorro || LINEAR || Tj (2.97) || align=right | 5.8 km || 
|-id=792 bgcolor=#E9E9E9
| 285792 ||  || — || November 29, 2000 || Kitt Peak || Spacewatch || — || align=right | 2.7 km || 
|-id=793 bgcolor=#E9E9E9
| 285793 ||  || — || November 29, 2000 || Kitt Peak || Spacewatch || — || align=right | 2.9 km || 
|-id=794 bgcolor=#fefefe
| 285794 ||  || — || November 30, 2000 || Socorro || LINEAR || — || align=right | 1.2 km || 
|-id=795 bgcolor=#fefefe
| 285795 ||  || — || November 20, 2000 || Socorro || LINEAR || — || align=right data-sort-value="0.87" | 870 m || 
|-id=796 bgcolor=#fefefe
| 285796 ||  || — || November 29, 2000 || Haleakala || NEAT || — || align=right data-sort-value="0.90" | 900 m || 
|-id=797 bgcolor=#fefefe
| 285797 ||  || — || November 24, 2000 || Kitt Peak || DLS || FLO || align=right data-sort-value="0.65" | 650 m || 
|-id=798 bgcolor=#E9E9E9
| 285798 ||  || — || November 19, 2000 || Socorro || LINEAR || — || align=right | 1.9 km || 
|-id=799 bgcolor=#d6d6d6
| 285799 ||  || — || December 4, 2000 || Socorro || LINEAR || TIR || align=right | 4.2 km || 
|-id=800 bgcolor=#fefefe
| 285800 ||  || — || December 4, 2000 || Socorro || LINEAR || — || align=right | 1.7 km || 
|}

285801–285900 

|-bgcolor=#fefefe
| 285801 ||  || — || December 19, 2000 || Bohyunsan || Y.-B. Jeon, B.-C. Lee || — || align=right | 2.8 km || 
|-id=802 bgcolor=#fefefe
| 285802 ||  || — || December 22, 2000 || Ondřejov || P. Kušnirák, P. Pravec || PHO || align=right | 2.8 km || 
|-id=803 bgcolor=#E9E9E9
| 285803 ||  || — || December 28, 2000 || Kitt Peak || Spacewatch || — || align=right | 2.8 km || 
|-id=804 bgcolor=#fefefe
| 285804 ||  || — || December 28, 2000 || Kitt Peak || Spacewatch || — || align=right | 1.4 km || 
|-id=805 bgcolor=#E9E9E9
| 285805 ||  || — || December 30, 2000 || Kitt Peak || Spacewatch || — || align=right | 2.2 km || 
|-id=806 bgcolor=#E9E9E9
| 285806 ||  || — || December 30, 2000 || Socorro || LINEAR || — || align=right | 3.1 km || 
|-id=807 bgcolor=#E9E9E9
| 285807 ||  || — || December 30, 2000 || Socorro || LINEAR || — || align=right | 2.0 km || 
|-id=808 bgcolor=#fefefe
| 285808 ||  || — || December 30, 2000 || Socorro || LINEAR || — || align=right | 1.1 km || 
|-id=809 bgcolor=#d6d6d6
| 285809 ||  || — || December 30, 2000 || Socorro || LINEAR || — || align=right | 4.7 km || 
|-id=810 bgcolor=#fefefe
| 285810 ||  || — || December 30, 2000 || Socorro || LINEAR || H || align=right data-sort-value="0.69" | 690 m || 
|-id=811 bgcolor=#E9E9E9
| 285811 ||  || — || December 30, 2000 || Socorro || LINEAR || MAR || align=right | 1.8 km || 
|-id=812 bgcolor=#fefefe
| 285812 ||  || — || December 28, 2000 || Socorro || LINEAR || H || align=right | 1.0 km || 
|-id=813 bgcolor=#fefefe
| 285813 ||  || — || December 30, 2000 || Kitt Peak || Spacewatch || — || align=right data-sort-value="0.76" | 760 m || 
|-id=814 bgcolor=#E9E9E9
| 285814 ||  || — || December 20, 2000 || Kitt Peak || Spacewatch || RAF || align=right | 1.2 km || 
|-id=815 bgcolor=#fefefe
| 285815 ||  || — || January 2, 2001 || Socorro || LINEAR || NYS || align=right data-sort-value="0.90" | 900 m || 
|-id=816 bgcolor=#fefefe
| 285816 ||  || — || January 16, 2001 || Kitt Peak || Spacewatch || V || align=right data-sort-value="0.67" | 670 m || 
|-id=817 bgcolor=#d6d6d6
| 285817 ||  || — || January 19, 2001 || Socorro || LINEAR || — || align=right | 4.0 km || 
|-id=818 bgcolor=#FFC2E0
| 285818 ||  || — || January 19, 2001 || Haleakala || NEAT || AMO || align=right data-sort-value="0.68" | 680 m || 
|-id=819 bgcolor=#fefefe
| 285819 ||  || — || January 24, 2001 || Socorro || LINEAR || — || align=right | 1.1 km || 
|-id=820 bgcolor=#fefefe
| 285820 ||  || — || January 19, 2001 || Kitt Peak || Spacewatch || NYS || align=right data-sort-value="0.99" | 990 m || 
|-id=821 bgcolor=#E9E9E9
| 285821 ||  || — || February 15, 2001 || Socorro || LINEAR || — || align=right | 1.9 km || 
|-id=822 bgcolor=#E9E9E9
| 285822 ||  || — || February 12, 2001 || Anderson Mesa || LONEOS || — || align=right | 2.0 km || 
|-id=823 bgcolor=#d6d6d6
| 285823 ||  || — || February 16, 2001 || Nogales || Tenagra II Obs. || — || align=right | 4.9 km || 
|-id=824 bgcolor=#d6d6d6
| 285824 ||  || — || February 17, 2001 || Socorro || LINEAR || — || align=right | 3.3 km || 
|-id=825 bgcolor=#E9E9E9
| 285825 ||  || — || February 19, 2001 || Socorro || LINEAR || — || align=right | 3.2 km || 
|-id=826 bgcolor=#E9E9E9
| 285826 ||  || — || February 19, 2001 || Socorro || LINEAR || — || align=right | 2.0 km || 
|-id=827 bgcolor=#fefefe
| 285827 ||  || — || February 19, 2001 || Socorro || LINEAR || — || align=right | 1.2 km || 
|-id=828 bgcolor=#E9E9E9
| 285828 ||  || — || February 19, 2001 || Socorro || LINEAR || — || align=right | 1.9 km || 
|-id=829 bgcolor=#fefefe
| 285829 ||  || — || February 16, 2001 || Kitt Peak || Spacewatch || — || align=right | 1.1 km || 
|-id=830 bgcolor=#E9E9E9
| 285830 ||  || — || February 19, 2001 || Socorro || LINEAR || — || align=right | 2.1 km || 
|-id=831 bgcolor=#fefefe
| 285831 ||  || — || February 19, 2001 || Socorro || LINEAR || — || align=right data-sort-value="0.78" | 780 m || 
|-id=832 bgcolor=#d6d6d6
| 285832 ||  || — || February 21, 2001 || Kitt Peak || Spacewatch || URS || align=right | 4.5 km || 
|-id=833 bgcolor=#E9E9E9
| 285833 ||  || — || February 22, 2001 || Kitt Peak || Spacewatch || — || align=right | 1.8 km || 
|-id=834 bgcolor=#E9E9E9
| 285834 ||  || — || February 22, 2001 || Kitt Peak || Spacewatch || — || align=right | 2.9 km || 
|-id=835 bgcolor=#d6d6d6
| 285835 ||  || — || February 23, 2001 || Cerro Tololo || DLS || SYL7:4 || align=right | 6.3 km || 
|-id=836 bgcolor=#E9E9E9
| 285836 ||  || — || March 14, 2001 || Anderson Mesa || LONEOS || — || align=right | 2.2 km || 
|-id=837 bgcolor=#fefefe
| 285837 ||  || — || March 15, 2001 || Kitt Peak || Spacewatch || MAS || align=right data-sort-value="0.93" | 930 m || 
|-id=838 bgcolor=#FFC2E0
| 285838 ||  || — || March 17, 2001 || Socorro || LINEAR || AMO +1km || align=right data-sort-value="0.96" | 960 m || 
|-id=839 bgcolor=#d6d6d6
| 285839 ||  || — || March 18, 2001 || Socorro || LINEAR || — || align=right | 5.7 km || 
|-id=840 bgcolor=#fefefe
| 285840 ||  || — || March 18, 2001 || Socorro || LINEAR || — || align=right | 1.1 km || 
|-id=841 bgcolor=#E9E9E9
| 285841 ||  || — || March 19, 2001 || Socorro || LINEAR || — || align=right | 2.5 km || 
|-id=842 bgcolor=#E9E9E9
| 285842 ||  || — || March 26, 2001 || Kitt Peak || Spacewatch || — || align=right | 1.4 km || 
|-id=843 bgcolor=#fefefe
| 285843 ||  || — || March 21, 2001 || Anderson Mesa || LONEOS || — || align=right | 1.1 km || 
|-id=844 bgcolor=#d6d6d6
| 285844 ||  || — || March 27, 2001 || Kitt Peak || Spacewatch || CHA || align=right | 2.1 km || 
|-id=845 bgcolor=#E9E9E9
| 285845 ||  || — || March 18, 2001 || Anderson Mesa || LONEOS || RAF || align=right | 1.5 km || 
|-id=846 bgcolor=#fefefe
| 285846 ||  || — || March 18, 2001 || Socorro || LINEAR || — || align=right | 1.1 km || 
|-id=847 bgcolor=#d6d6d6
| 285847 ||  || — || March 18, 2001 || Socorro || LINEAR || — || align=right | 2.8 km || 
|-id=848 bgcolor=#E9E9E9
| 285848 ||  || — || March 18, 2001 || Socorro || LINEAR || EUN || align=right | 1.6 km || 
|-id=849 bgcolor=#E9E9E9
| 285849 ||  || — || March 20, 2001 || Haleakala || NEAT || INO || align=right | 1.8 km || 
|-id=850 bgcolor=#E9E9E9
| 285850 ||  || — || March 27, 2001 || Haleakala || NEAT || — || align=right | 2.8 km || 
|-id=851 bgcolor=#E9E9E9
| 285851 ||  || — || March 23, 2001 || Anderson Mesa || LONEOS || — || align=right | 2.1 km || 
|-id=852 bgcolor=#E9E9E9
| 285852 ||  || — || March 20, 2001 || Anderson Mesa || LONEOS || EUN || align=right | 1.9 km || 
|-id=853 bgcolor=#E9E9E9
| 285853 ||  || — || March 21, 2001 || Kitt Peak || Spacewatch || — || align=right | 1.4 km || 
|-id=854 bgcolor=#E9E9E9
| 285854 ||  || — || March 18, 2001 || Haleakala || NEAT || EUN || align=right | 2.0 km || 
|-id=855 bgcolor=#E9E9E9
| 285855 ||  || — || March 20, 2001 || Kitt Peak || Spacewatch || — || align=right | 1.5 km || 
|-id=856 bgcolor=#fefefe
| 285856 ||  || — || March 21, 2001 || Anderson Mesa || LONEOS || — || align=right | 1.4 km || 
|-id=857 bgcolor=#fefefe
| 285857 ||  || — || April 14, 2001 || Socorro || LINEAR || PHO || align=right | 1.6 km || 
|-id=858 bgcolor=#fefefe
| 285858 ||  || — || April 15, 2001 || Haleakala || NEAT || ERI || align=right | 2.6 km || 
|-id=859 bgcolor=#E9E9E9
| 285859 ||  || — || April 23, 2001 || Kitt Peak || Spacewatch || GAL || align=right | 1.8 km || 
|-id=860 bgcolor=#d6d6d6
| 285860 ||  || — || April 27, 2001 || Kitt Peak || Spacewatch || — || align=right | 3.8 km || 
|-id=861 bgcolor=#E9E9E9
| 285861 ||  || — || April 30, 2001 || Kitt Peak || Spacewatch || — || align=right | 3.0 km || 
|-id=862 bgcolor=#d6d6d6
| 285862 ||  || — || April 21, 2001 || Socorro || LINEAR || EUP || align=right | 6.5 km || 
|-id=863 bgcolor=#fefefe
| 285863 ||  || — || April 25, 2001 || Anderson Mesa || LONEOS || — || align=right | 1.2 km || 
|-id=864 bgcolor=#E9E9E9
| 285864 ||  || — || April 24, 2001 || Anderson Mesa || LONEOS || — || align=right | 2.3 km || 
|-id=865 bgcolor=#fefefe
| 285865 ||  || — || May 15, 2001 || Anderson Mesa || LONEOS || — || align=right | 1.8 km || 
|-id=866 bgcolor=#d6d6d6
| 285866 ||  || — || May 18, 2001 || Socorro || LINEAR || — || align=right | 5.0 km || 
|-id=867 bgcolor=#fefefe
| 285867 ||  || — || May 18, 2001 || Socorro || LINEAR || — || align=right | 1.5 km || 
|-id=868 bgcolor=#fefefe
| 285868 ||  || — || May 18, 2001 || Socorro || LINEAR || — || align=right | 2.2 km || 
|-id=869 bgcolor=#E9E9E9
| 285869 ||  || — || May 18, 2001 || Socorro || LINEAR || — || align=right | 1.9 km || 
|-id=870 bgcolor=#fefefe
| 285870 ||  || — || May 22, 2001 || Socorro || LINEAR || H || align=right data-sort-value="0.92" | 920 m || 
|-id=871 bgcolor=#fefefe
| 285871 ||  || — || June 27, 2001 || Palomar || NEAT || — || align=right | 1.1 km || 
|-id=872 bgcolor=#FA8072
| 285872 ||  || — || July 13, 2001 || Palomar || NEAT || — || align=right data-sort-value="0.87" | 870 m || 
|-id=873 bgcolor=#fefefe
| 285873 ||  || — || July 14, 2001 || Palomar || NEAT || — || align=right data-sort-value="0.83" | 830 m || 
|-id=874 bgcolor=#E9E9E9
| 285874 ||  || — || July 13, 2001 || Palomar || NEAT || — || align=right | 1.6 km || 
|-id=875 bgcolor=#fefefe
| 285875 ||  || — || July 17, 2001 || Haleakala || NEAT || — || align=right data-sort-value="0.85" | 850 m || 
|-id=876 bgcolor=#fefefe
| 285876 ||  || — || July 17, 2001 || Palomar || NEAT || — || align=right | 1.1 km || 
|-id=877 bgcolor=#E9E9E9
| 285877 ||  || — || July 18, 2001 || Palomar || NEAT || — || align=right | 1.4 km || 
|-id=878 bgcolor=#E9E9E9
| 285878 ||  || — || July 22, 2001 || Palomar || NEAT || — || align=right | 1.6 km || 
|-id=879 bgcolor=#d6d6d6
| 285879 ||  || — || July 21, 2001 || Haleakala || NEAT || YAK || align=right | 3.7 km || 
|-id=880 bgcolor=#E9E9E9
| 285880 ||  || — || July 29, 2001 || Palomar || NEAT || ADE || align=right | 2.9 km || 
|-id=881 bgcolor=#E9E9E9
| 285881 ||  || — || July 26, 2001 || Palomar || NEAT || — || align=right | 1.4 km || 
|-id=882 bgcolor=#E9E9E9
| 285882 ||  || — || July 30, 2001 || Palomar || NEAT || — || align=right | 1.8 km || 
|-id=883 bgcolor=#E9E9E9
| 285883 ||  || — || July 24, 2001 || Bergisch Gladbac || W. Bickel || GEF || align=right | 2.0 km || 
|-id=884 bgcolor=#E9E9E9
| 285884 ||  || — || August 3, 2001 || Haleakala || NEAT || — || align=right | 3.0 km || 
|-id=885 bgcolor=#E9E9E9
| 285885 ||  || — || August 10, 2001 || Palomar || NEAT || HNS || align=right | 1.8 km || 
|-id=886 bgcolor=#E9E9E9
| 285886 ||  || — || August 10, 2001 || Palomar || NEAT || DOR || align=right | 3.0 km || 
|-id=887 bgcolor=#E9E9E9
| 285887 ||  || — || August 10, 2001 || Palomar || NEAT || — || align=right | 1.3 km || 
|-id=888 bgcolor=#E9E9E9
| 285888 ||  || — || August 13, 2001 || Uccle || T. Pauwels || — || align=right | 2.0 km || 
|-id=889 bgcolor=#E9E9E9
| 285889 ||  || — || August 10, 2001 || Palomar || NEAT || — || align=right | 1.6 km || 
|-id=890 bgcolor=#fefefe
| 285890 ||  || — || August 14, 2001 || Haleakala || NEAT || NYS || align=right data-sort-value="0.89" | 890 m || 
|-id=891 bgcolor=#E9E9E9
| 285891 ||  || — || August 14, 2001 || Haleakala || NEAT || — || align=right | 1.8 km || 
|-id=892 bgcolor=#fefefe
| 285892 ||  || — || August 16, 2001 || Socorro || LINEAR || — || align=right data-sort-value="0.87" | 870 m || 
|-id=893 bgcolor=#fefefe
| 285893 ||  || — || August 16, 2001 || Socorro || LINEAR || FLO || align=right | 1.1 km || 
|-id=894 bgcolor=#fefefe
| 285894 ||  || — || August 16, 2001 || Socorro || LINEAR || — || align=right | 1.4 km || 
|-id=895 bgcolor=#E9E9E9
| 285895 ||  || — || August 16, 2001 || Socorro || LINEAR || DOR || align=right | 3.0 km || 
|-id=896 bgcolor=#fefefe
| 285896 ||  || — || August 16, 2001 || Socorro || LINEAR || — || align=right data-sort-value="0.98" | 980 m || 
|-id=897 bgcolor=#fefefe
| 285897 ||  || — || August 16, 2001 || Socorro || LINEAR || — || align=right data-sort-value="0.79" | 790 m || 
|-id=898 bgcolor=#E9E9E9
| 285898 ||  || — || August 16, 2001 || Socorro || LINEAR || — || align=right | 3.9 km || 
|-id=899 bgcolor=#fefefe
| 285899 ||  || — || August 17, 2001 || Socorro || LINEAR || H || align=right data-sort-value="0.90" | 900 m || 
|-id=900 bgcolor=#E9E9E9
| 285900 ||  || — || August 17, 2001 || Palomar || NEAT || — || align=right | 1.4 km || 
|}

285901–286000 

|-bgcolor=#E9E9E9
| 285901 ||  || — || August 22, 2001 || Kitt Peak || Spacewatch || — || align=right | 2.2 km || 
|-id=902 bgcolor=#FA8072
| 285902 ||  || — || August 19, 2001 || Socorro || LINEAR || PHO || align=right | 1.4 km || 
|-id=903 bgcolor=#E9E9E9
| 285903 ||  || — || August 19, 2001 || Socorro || LINEAR || JUN || align=right | 1.7 km || 
|-id=904 bgcolor=#E9E9E9
| 285904 ||  || — || August 19, 2001 || Socorro || LINEAR || — || align=right | 1.1 km || 
|-id=905 bgcolor=#E9E9E9
| 285905 ||  || — || August 19, 2001 || Socorro || LINEAR || — || align=right | 1.1 km || 
|-id=906 bgcolor=#E9E9E9
| 285906 ||  || — || August 19, 2001 || Socorro || LINEAR || EUN || align=right | 1.4 km || 
|-id=907 bgcolor=#E9E9E9
| 285907 ||  || — || August 20, 2001 || Socorro || LINEAR || RAF || align=right | 1.3 km || 
|-id=908 bgcolor=#fefefe
| 285908 ||  || — || August 20, 2001 || Socorro || LINEAR || FLO || align=right data-sort-value="0.98" | 980 m || 
|-id=909 bgcolor=#d6d6d6
| 285909 ||  || — || August 21, 2001 || Kitt Peak || Spacewatch || KOR || align=right | 1.5 km || 
|-id=910 bgcolor=#d6d6d6
| 285910 ||  || — || August 21, 2001 || Haleakala || NEAT || SHU3:2 || align=right | 7.9 km || 
|-id=911 bgcolor=#E9E9E9
| 285911 ||  || — || August 22, 2001 || Socorro || LINEAR || — || align=right | 3.1 km || 
|-id=912 bgcolor=#E9E9E9
| 285912 ||  || — || August 23, 2001 || Anderson Mesa || LONEOS || — || align=right | 2.1 km || 
|-id=913 bgcolor=#E9E9E9
| 285913 ||  || — || August 23, 2001 || Anderson Mesa || LONEOS || — || align=right | 1.8 km || 
|-id=914 bgcolor=#E9E9E9
| 285914 ||  || — || August 23, 2001 || Anderson Mesa || LONEOS || — || align=right | 2.0 km || 
|-id=915 bgcolor=#E9E9E9
| 285915 ||  || — || August 21, 2001 || Palomar || NEAT || — || align=right | 1.6 km || 
|-id=916 bgcolor=#E9E9E9
| 285916 ||  || — || August 26, 2001 || Haleakala || NEAT || — || align=right | 4.6 km || 
|-id=917 bgcolor=#E9E9E9
| 285917 ||  || — || August 25, 2001 || Socorro || LINEAR || — || align=right | 3.2 km || 
|-id=918 bgcolor=#E9E9E9
| 285918 ||  || — || August 23, 2001 || Kitt Peak || Spacewatch || — || align=right data-sort-value="0.83" | 830 m || 
|-id=919 bgcolor=#E9E9E9
| 285919 ||  || — || August 21, 2001 || Desert Eagle || W. K. Y. Yeung || — || align=right | 1.5 km || 
|-id=920 bgcolor=#fefefe
| 285920 ||  || — || August 21, 2001 || Kitt Peak || Spacewatch || NYS || align=right data-sort-value="0.70" | 700 m || 
|-id=921 bgcolor=#E9E9E9
| 285921 ||  || — || August 22, 2001 || Socorro || LINEAR || JUN || align=right | 1.7 km || 
|-id=922 bgcolor=#d6d6d6
| 285922 ||  || — || August 23, 2001 || Anderson Mesa || LONEOS || — || align=right | 3.5 km || 
|-id=923 bgcolor=#fefefe
| 285923 ||  || — || August 23, 2001 || Anderson Mesa || LONEOS || FLO || align=right data-sort-value="0.64" | 640 m || 
|-id=924 bgcolor=#E9E9E9
| 285924 ||  || — || August 23, 2001 || Anderson Mesa || LONEOS || — || align=right | 1.9 km || 
|-id=925 bgcolor=#fefefe
| 285925 ||  || — || August 23, 2001 || Kitt Peak || Spacewatch || — || align=right | 1.0 km || 
|-id=926 bgcolor=#E9E9E9
| 285926 ||  || — || August 24, 2001 || Anderson Mesa || LONEOS || — || align=right | 2.5 km || 
|-id=927 bgcolor=#fefefe
| 285927 ||  || — || August 24, 2001 || Socorro || LINEAR || — || align=right | 1.1 km || 
|-id=928 bgcolor=#d6d6d6
| 285928 ||  || — || August 24, 2001 || Socorro || LINEAR || — || align=right | 4.4 km || 
|-id=929 bgcolor=#fefefe
| 285929 ||  || — || August 25, 2001 || Socorro || LINEAR || — || align=right data-sort-value="0.87" | 870 m || 
|-id=930 bgcolor=#E9E9E9
| 285930 ||  || — || August 25, 2001 || Socorro || LINEAR || — || align=right | 2.5 km || 
|-id=931 bgcolor=#fefefe
| 285931 ||  || — || August 25, 2001 || Anderson Mesa || LONEOS || — || align=right data-sort-value="0.94" | 940 m || 
|-id=932 bgcolor=#fefefe
| 285932 ||  || — || August 25, 2001 || Socorro || LINEAR || H || align=right data-sort-value="0.94" | 940 m || 
|-id=933 bgcolor=#E9E9E9
| 285933 ||  || — || August 19, 2001 || Socorro || LINEAR || — || align=right | 1.1 km || 
|-id=934 bgcolor=#E9E9E9
| 285934 ||  || — || August 19, 2001 || Socorro || LINEAR || — || align=right | 3.5 km || 
|-id=935 bgcolor=#E9E9E9
| 285935 ||  || — || August 19, 2001 || Socorro || LINEAR || — || align=right | 4.6 km || 
|-id=936 bgcolor=#E9E9E9
| 285936 ||  || — || August 17, 2001 || Palomar || NEAT || — || align=right | 1.4 km || 
|-id=937 bgcolor=#d6d6d6
| 285937 Anthonytaylor ||  ||  || August 20, 2001 || Cerro Tololo || M. W. Buie || KOR || align=right | 2.0 km || 
|-id=938 bgcolor=#fefefe
| 285938 ||  || — || August 27, 2001 || Palomar || NEAT || V || align=right data-sort-value="0.92" | 920 m || 
|-id=939 bgcolor=#E9E9E9
| 285939 ||  || — || August 23, 2001 || Haleakala || NEAT || — || align=right | 1.5 km || 
|-id=940 bgcolor=#E9E9E9
| 285940 ||  || — || August 25, 2001 || Socorro || LINEAR || — || align=right | 1.6 km || 
|-id=941 bgcolor=#d6d6d6
| 285941 ||  || — || August 27, 2001 || Kitt Peak || Spacewatch || KOR || align=right | 1.5 km || 
|-id=942 bgcolor=#fefefe
| 285942 ||  || — || August 27, 2001 || Palomar || NEAT || — || align=right data-sort-value="0.70" | 700 m || 
|-id=943 bgcolor=#d6d6d6
| 285943 ||  || — || September 8, 2001 || Socorro || LINEAR || — || align=right | 5.2 km || 
|-id=944 bgcolor=#FFC2E0
| 285944 ||  || — || September 10, 2001 || Socorro || LINEAR || AMO +1km || align=right | 1.0 km || 
|-id=945 bgcolor=#d6d6d6
| 285945 ||  || — || September 10, 2001 || Socorro || LINEAR || HYG || align=right | 3.7 km || 
|-id=946 bgcolor=#d6d6d6
| 285946 ||  || — || September 10, 2001 || Socorro || LINEAR || — || align=right | 3.9 km || 
|-id=947 bgcolor=#E9E9E9
| 285947 ||  || — || September 7, 2001 || Socorro || LINEAR || — || align=right | 1.8 km || 
|-id=948 bgcolor=#d6d6d6
| 285948 ||  || — || September 7, 2001 || Socorro || LINEAR || — || align=right | 4.4 km || 
|-id=949 bgcolor=#E9E9E9
| 285949 ||  || — || September 7, 2001 || Socorro || LINEAR || — || align=right | 1.9 km || 
|-id=950 bgcolor=#fefefe
| 285950 ||  || — || September 7, 2001 || Socorro || LINEAR || FLO || align=right data-sort-value="0.70" | 700 m || 
|-id=951 bgcolor=#E9E9E9
| 285951 ||  || — || September 7, 2001 || Socorro || LINEAR || RAF || align=right | 1.2 km || 
|-id=952 bgcolor=#d6d6d6
| 285952 ||  || — || September 7, 2001 || Socorro || LINEAR || — || align=right | 3.6 km || 
|-id=953 bgcolor=#E9E9E9
| 285953 ||  || — || September 7, 2001 || Socorro || LINEAR || — || align=right | 2.0 km || 
|-id=954 bgcolor=#E9E9E9
| 285954 ||  || — || September 7, 2001 || Socorro || LINEAR || — || align=right | 2.2 km || 
|-id=955 bgcolor=#E9E9E9
| 285955 ||  || — || September 8, 2001 || Socorro || LINEAR || INO || align=right | 1.3 km || 
|-id=956 bgcolor=#d6d6d6
| 285956 ||  || — || September 8, 2001 || Socorro || LINEAR || — || align=right | 3.6 km || 
|-id=957 bgcolor=#E9E9E9
| 285957 ||  || — || September 11, 2001 || Socorro || LINEAR || — || align=right | 1.8 km || 
|-id=958 bgcolor=#d6d6d6
| 285958 ||  || — || September 12, 2001 || Socorro || LINEAR || — || align=right | 2.3 km || 
|-id=959 bgcolor=#E9E9E9
| 285959 ||  || — || September 12, 2001 || Socorro || LINEAR || EUN || align=right | 1.6 km || 
|-id=960 bgcolor=#fefefe
| 285960 ||  || — || September 10, 2001 || Socorro || LINEAR || — || align=right | 1.1 km || 
|-id=961 bgcolor=#d6d6d6
| 285961 ||  || — || September 10, 2001 || Socorro || LINEAR || — || align=right | 5.8 km || 
|-id=962 bgcolor=#d6d6d6
| 285962 ||  || — || September 10, 2001 || Socorro || LINEAR || — || align=right | 3.9 km || 
|-id=963 bgcolor=#d6d6d6
| 285963 ||  || — || September 11, 2001 || Anderson Mesa || LONEOS || — || align=right | 4.1 km || 
|-id=964 bgcolor=#fefefe
| 285964 ||  || — || September 11, 2001 || Anderson Mesa || LONEOS || — || align=right data-sort-value="0.93" | 930 m || 
|-id=965 bgcolor=#d6d6d6
| 285965 ||  || — || September 12, 2001 || Kitt Peak || Spacewatch || KOR || align=right | 1.5 km || 
|-id=966 bgcolor=#E9E9E9
| 285966 ||  || — || September 12, 2001 || Kitt Peak || Spacewatch || — || align=right | 1.6 km || 
|-id=967 bgcolor=#fefefe
| 285967 ||  || — || September 12, 2001 || Socorro || LINEAR || — || align=right | 1.0 km || 
|-id=968 bgcolor=#E9E9E9
| 285968 ||  || — || September 12, 2001 || Socorro || LINEAR || — || align=right | 1.3 km || 
|-id=969 bgcolor=#d6d6d6
| 285969 ||  || — || September 12, 2001 || Socorro || LINEAR || — || align=right | 4.2 km || 
|-id=970 bgcolor=#E9E9E9
| 285970 ||  || — || September 12, 2001 || Socorro || LINEAR || PAD || align=right | 1.8 km || 
|-id=971 bgcolor=#fefefe
| 285971 ||  || — || September 12, 2001 || Socorro || LINEAR || NYSfast? || align=right data-sort-value="0.74" | 740 m || 
|-id=972 bgcolor=#d6d6d6
| 285972 ||  || — || September 12, 2001 || Socorro || LINEAR || KOR || align=right | 2.3 km || 
|-id=973 bgcolor=#fefefe
| 285973 ||  || — || September 12, 2001 || Socorro || LINEAR || — || align=right data-sort-value="0.72" | 720 m || 
|-id=974 bgcolor=#d6d6d6
| 285974 ||  || — || September 12, 2001 || Socorro || LINEAR || — || align=right | 2.6 km || 
|-id=975 bgcolor=#E9E9E9
| 285975 ||  || — || September 12, 2001 || Socorro || LINEAR || — || align=right | 3.4 km || 
|-id=976 bgcolor=#E9E9E9
| 285976 ||  || — || September 12, 2001 || Socorro || LINEAR || — || align=right | 1.2 km || 
|-id=977 bgcolor=#E9E9E9
| 285977 ||  || — || September 12, 2001 || Socorro || LINEAR || — || align=right | 1.1 km || 
|-id=978 bgcolor=#E9E9E9
| 285978 ||  || — || September 12, 2001 || Socorro || LINEAR || DOR || align=right | 4.3 km || 
|-id=979 bgcolor=#fefefe
| 285979 ||  || — || September 12, 2001 || Socorro || LINEAR || V || align=right data-sort-value="0.72" | 720 m || 
|-id=980 bgcolor=#d6d6d6
| 285980 ||  || — || September 12, 2001 || Socorro || LINEAR || — || align=right | 3.2 km || 
|-id=981 bgcolor=#E9E9E9
| 285981 ||  || — || September 7, 2001 || Palomar || NEAT || — || align=right | 3.4 km || 
|-id=982 bgcolor=#E9E9E9
| 285982 ||  || — || September 8, 2001 || Socorro || LINEAR || — || align=right | 1.0 km || 
|-id=983 bgcolor=#d6d6d6
| 285983 ||  || — || September 8, 2001 || Socorro || LINEAR || — || align=right | 4.9 km || 
|-id=984 bgcolor=#E9E9E9
| 285984 ||  || — || September 10, 2001 || Anderson Mesa || LONEOS || DOR || align=right | 3.0 km || 
|-id=985 bgcolor=#E9E9E9
| 285985 ||  || — || September 10, 2001 || Anderson Mesa || LONEOS || — || align=right | 1.9 km || 
|-id=986 bgcolor=#d6d6d6
| 285986 ||  || — || September 11, 2001 || Anderson Mesa || LONEOS || — || align=right | 4.3 km || 
|-id=987 bgcolor=#fefefe
| 285987 ||  || — || September 11, 2001 || Anderson Mesa || LONEOS || FLO || align=right data-sort-value="0.69" | 690 m || 
|-id=988 bgcolor=#E9E9E9
| 285988 ||  || — || September 11, 2001 || Kitt Peak || Spacewatch || — || align=right | 1.5 km || 
|-id=989 bgcolor=#d6d6d6
| 285989 ||  || — || September 17, 2001 || Desert Eagle || W. K. Y. Yeung || 3:2 || align=right | 5.9 km || 
|-id=990 bgcolor=#FFC2E0
| 285990 ||  || — || September 17, 2001 || Socorro || LINEAR || APO +1km || align=right data-sort-value="0.91" | 910 m || 
|-id=991 bgcolor=#d6d6d6
| 285991 ||  || — || September 16, 2001 || Socorro || LINEAR || SAN || align=right | 2.1 km || 
|-id=992 bgcolor=#E9E9E9
| 285992 ||  || — || September 16, 2001 || Socorro || LINEAR || — || align=right | 3.0 km || 
|-id=993 bgcolor=#d6d6d6
| 285993 ||  || — || September 16, 2001 || Socorro || LINEAR || EUP || align=right | 4.4 km || 
|-id=994 bgcolor=#fefefe
| 285994 ||  || — || September 17, 2001 || Socorro || LINEAR || — || align=right | 1.1 km || 
|-id=995 bgcolor=#fefefe
| 285995 ||  || — || September 17, 2001 || Socorro || LINEAR || — || align=right | 1.2 km || 
|-id=996 bgcolor=#d6d6d6
| 285996 ||  || — || September 17, 2001 || Socorro || LINEAR || — || align=right | 3.9 km || 
|-id=997 bgcolor=#d6d6d6
| 285997 ||  || — || September 16, 2001 || Socorro || LINEAR || — || align=right | 2.8 km || 
|-id=998 bgcolor=#E9E9E9
| 285998 ||  || — || September 19, 2001 || Socorro || LINEAR || — || align=right | 4.8 km || 
|-id=999 bgcolor=#fefefe
| 285999 ||  || — || September 20, 2001 || Socorro || LINEAR || — || align=right data-sort-value="0.94" | 940 m || 
|-id=000 bgcolor=#fefefe
| 286000 ||  || — || September 20, 2001 || Socorro || LINEAR || FLO || align=right data-sort-value="0.56" | 560 m || 
|}

References

External links 
 Discovery Circumstances: Numbered Minor Planets (285001)–(290000) (IAU Minor Planet Center)

0285